

196001–196100 

|-bgcolor=#d6d6d6
| 196001 ||  || — || September 13, 2002 || Palomar || R. Matson || — || align=right | 4.0 km || 
|-id=002 bgcolor=#d6d6d6
| 196002 ||  || — || September 1, 2002 || Palomar || S. F. Hönig || — || align=right | 5.1 km || 
|-id=003 bgcolor=#d6d6d6
| 196003 ||  || — || September 14, 2002 || Palomar || R. Matson || EOS || align=right | 3.3 km || 
|-id=004 bgcolor=#d6d6d6
| 196004 ||  || — || September 15, 2002 || Palomar || S. F. Hönig || — || align=right | 3.4 km || 
|-id=005 bgcolor=#d6d6d6
| 196005 Róbertschiller ||  ||  || September 12, 2002 || Piszkéstető || K. Sárneczky || — || align=right | 4.5 km || 
|-id=006 bgcolor=#d6d6d6
| 196006 ||  || — || September 14, 2002 || Palomar || R. Matson || — || align=right | 4.2 km || 
|-id=007 bgcolor=#d6d6d6
| 196007 ||  || — || September 13, 2002 || Palomar || NEAT || EOS || align=right | 2.8 km || 
|-id=008 bgcolor=#d6d6d6
| 196008 ||  || — || September 5, 2002 || Haleakala || NEAT || — || align=right | 5.3 km || 
|-id=009 bgcolor=#d6d6d6
| 196009 ||  || — || September 13, 2002 || Palomar || NEAT || EOS || align=right | 2.5 km || 
|-id=010 bgcolor=#d6d6d6
| 196010 ||  || — || September 15, 2002 || Palomar || NEAT || — || align=right | 3.2 km || 
|-id=011 bgcolor=#d6d6d6
| 196011 ||  || — || September 3, 2002 || Haleakala || NEAT || — || align=right | 3.9 km || 
|-id=012 bgcolor=#d6d6d6
| 196012 ||  || — || September 9, 2002 || Palomar || NEAT || EOS || align=right | 2.7 km || 
|-id=013 bgcolor=#d6d6d6
| 196013 ||  || — || September 14, 2002 || Palomar || NEAT || — || align=right | 3.1 km || 
|-id=014 bgcolor=#E9E9E9
| 196014 ||  || — || September 14, 2002 || Palomar || NEAT || — || align=right data-sort-value="0.82" | 820 m || 
|-id=015 bgcolor=#d6d6d6
| 196015 ||  || — || September 13, 2002 || Palomar || NEAT || — || align=right | 7.2 km || 
|-id=016 bgcolor=#d6d6d6
| 196016 ||  || — || September 13, 2002 || Palomar || NEAT || — || align=right | 3.6 km || 
|-id=017 bgcolor=#d6d6d6
| 196017 ||  || — || September 4, 2002 || Palomar || NEAT || HYG || align=right | 3.3 km || 
|-id=018 bgcolor=#d6d6d6
| 196018 ||  || — || September 15, 2002 || Palomar || NEAT || — || align=right | 2.6 km || 
|-id=019 bgcolor=#d6d6d6
| 196019 ||  || — || September 26, 2002 || Palomar || NEAT || — || align=right | 4.0 km || 
|-id=020 bgcolor=#d6d6d6
| 196020 ||  || — || September 26, 2002 || Palomar || NEAT || — || align=right | 4.3 km || 
|-id=021 bgcolor=#fefefe
| 196021 ||  || — || September 27, 2002 || Palomar || NEAT || H || align=right | 1.4 km || 
|-id=022 bgcolor=#d6d6d6
| 196022 ||  || — || September 27, 2002 || Palomar || NEAT || — || align=right | 4.5 km || 
|-id=023 bgcolor=#d6d6d6
| 196023 ||  || — || September 27, 2002 || Palomar || NEAT || KAR || align=right | 1.9 km || 
|-id=024 bgcolor=#d6d6d6
| 196024 ||  || — || September 27, 2002 || Palomar || NEAT || VER || align=right | 4.4 km || 
|-id=025 bgcolor=#d6d6d6
| 196025 ||  || — || September 27, 2002 || Palomar || NEAT || — || align=right | 3.9 km || 
|-id=026 bgcolor=#d6d6d6
| 196026 ||  || — || September 27, 2002 || Anderson Mesa || LONEOS || — || align=right | 6.0 km || 
|-id=027 bgcolor=#d6d6d6
| 196027 ||  || — || September 27, 2002 || Palomar || NEAT || THM || align=right | 4.0 km || 
|-id=028 bgcolor=#d6d6d6
| 196028 ||  || — || September 27, 2002 || Palomar || NEAT || — || align=right | 3.5 km || 
|-id=029 bgcolor=#d6d6d6
| 196029 ||  || — || September 27, 2002 || Palomar || NEAT || — || align=right | 4.0 km || 
|-id=030 bgcolor=#d6d6d6
| 196030 ||  || — || September 26, 2002 || Palomar || NEAT || — || align=right | 5.5 km || 
|-id=031 bgcolor=#d6d6d6
| 196031 ||  || — || September 26, 2002 || Palomar || NEAT || THM || align=right | 3.3 km || 
|-id=032 bgcolor=#d6d6d6
| 196032 ||  || — || September 26, 2002 || Palomar || NEAT || — || align=right | 4.4 km || 
|-id=033 bgcolor=#d6d6d6
| 196033 ||  || — || September 26, 2002 || Palomar || NEAT || THM || align=right | 3.9 km || 
|-id=034 bgcolor=#d6d6d6
| 196034 ||  || — || September 28, 2002 || Haleakala || NEAT || — || align=right | 6.9 km || 
|-id=035 bgcolor=#d6d6d6
| 196035 Haraldbill ||  ||  || September 30, 2002 || Michael Adrian || M. Kretlow || EUP || align=right | 5.4 km || 
|-id=036 bgcolor=#d6d6d6
| 196036 ||  || — || September 30, 2002 || Haleakala || NEAT || EUP || align=right | 5.7 km || 
|-id=037 bgcolor=#d6d6d6
| 196037 ||  || — || September 28, 2002 || Haleakala || NEAT || — || align=right | 5.0 km || 
|-id=038 bgcolor=#d6d6d6
| 196038 ||  || — || September 28, 2002 || Haleakala || NEAT || — || align=right | 4.8 km || 
|-id=039 bgcolor=#d6d6d6
| 196039 ||  || — || September 29, 2002 || Haleakala || NEAT || — || align=right | 5.9 km || 
|-id=040 bgcolor=#d6d6d6
| 196040 ||  || — || September 29, 2002 || Haleakala || NEAT || — || align=right | 4.4 km || 
|-id=041 bgcolor=#d6d6d6
| 196041 ||  || — || September 30, 2002 || Socorro || LINEAR || — || align=right | 5.3 km || 
|-id=042 bgcolor=#d6d6d6
| 196042 ||  || — || September 30, 2002 || Socorro || LINEAR || — || align=right | 6.6 km || 
|-id=043 bgcolor=#d6d6d6
| 196043 ||  || — || September 30, 2002 || Socorro || LINEAR || — || align=right | 4.7 km || 
|-id=044 bgcolor=#d6d6d6
| 196044 ||  || — || September 30, 2002 || Socorro || LINEAR || — || align=right | 4.8 km || 
|-id=045 bgcolor=#d6d6d6
| 196045 ||  || — || September 19, 2002 || Anderson Mesa || LONEOS || — || align=right | 6.6 km || 
|-id=046 bgcolor=#d6d6d6
| 196046 ||  || — || September 30, 2002 || Socorro || LINEAR || HYG || align=right | 4.6 km || 
|-id=047 bgcolor=#d6d6d6
| 196047 ||  || — || September 30, 2002 || Haleakala || NEAT || — || align=right | 6.7 km || 
|-id=048 bgcolor=#d6d6d6
| 196048 ||  || — || September 16, 2002 || Palomar || NEAT || — || align=right | 5.2 km || 
|-id=049 bgcolor=#d6d6d6
| 196049 ||  || — || September 17, 2002 || Palomar || NEAT || — || align=right | 5.7 km || 
|-id=050 bgcolor=#d6d6d6
| 196050 ||  || — || September 16, 2002 || Palomar || R. Matson || — || align=right | 4.4 km || 
|-id=051 bgcolor=#d6d6d6
| 196051 ||  || — || September 16, 2002 || Palomar || NEAT || — || align=right | 4.6 km || 
|-id=052 bgcolor=#d6d6d6
| 196052 ||  || — || September 16, 2002 || Palomar || NEAT || — || align=right | 4.4 km || 
|-id=053 bgcolor=#d6d6d6
| 196053 ||  || — || September 26, 2002 || Palomar || NEAT || — || align=right | 3.1 km || 
|-id=054 bgcolor=#d6d6d6
| 196054 || 2002 TK || — || October 1, 2002 || Anderson Mesa || LONEOS || 7:4 || align=right | 6.2 km || 
|-id=055 bgcolor=#d6d6d6
| 196055 ||  || — || October 1, 2002 || Anderson Mesa || LONEOS || HYG || align=right | 4.1 km || 
|-id=056 bgcolor=#d6d6d6
| 196056 ||  || — || October 1, 2002 || Anderson Mesa || LONEOS || — || align=right | 6.0 km || 
|-id=057 bgcolor=#d6d6d6
| 196057 ||  || — || October 1, 2002 || Anderson Mesa || LONEOS || HYG || align=right | 4.1 km || 
|-id=058 bgcolor=#d6d6d6
| 196058 ||  || — || October 2, 2002 || Socorro || LINEAR || — || align=right | 5.4 km || 
|-id=059 bgcolor=#d6d6d6
| 196059 ||  || — || October 2, 2002 || Socorro || LINEAR || URS || align=right | 6.0 km || 
|-id=060 bgcolor=#d6d6d6
| 196060 ||  || — || October 2, 2002 || Socorro || LINEAR || — || align=right | 6.2 km || 
|-id=061 bgcolor=#d6d6d6
| 196061 ||  || — || October 2, 2002 || Socorro || LINEAR || — || align=right | 4.9 km || 
|-id=062 bgcolor=#d6d6d6
| 196062 ||  || — || October 2, 2002 || Socorro || LINEAR || — || align=right | 5.9 km || 
|-id=063 bgcolor=#d6d6d6
| 196063 ||  || — || October 2, 2002 || Socorro || LINEAR || — || align=right | 4.6 km || 
|-id=064 bgcolor=#d6d6d6
| 196064 ||  || — || October 2, 2002 || Socorro || LINEAR || — || align=right | 6.7 km || 
|-id=065 bgcolor=#d6d6d6
| 196065 ||  || — || October 2, 2002 || Socorro || LINEAR || HYG || align=right | 6.1 km || 
|-id=066 bgcolor=#d6d6d6
| 196066 ||  || — || October 2, 2002 || Haleakala || NEAT || LUT || align=right | 6.9 km || 
|-id=067 bgcolor=#d6d6d6
| 196067 ||  || — || October 2, 2002 || Haleakala || NEAT || EOS || align=right | 3.4 km || 
|-id=068 bgcolor=#FFC2E0
| 196068 ||  || — || October 2, 2002 || Socorro || LINEAR || APO +1kmPHAcritical || align=right data-sort-value="0.89" | 890 m || 
|-id=069 bgcolor=#d6d6d6
| 196069 ||  || — || October 3, 2002 || Campo Imperatore || CINEOS || — || align=right | 5.3 km || 
|-id=070 bgcolor=#d6d6d6
| 196070 ||  || — || October 2, 2002 || Kvistaberg || UDAS || — || align=right | 6.1 km || 
|-id=071 bgcolor=#d6d6d6
| 196071 ||  || — || October 2, 2002 || Kvistaberg || UDAS || — || align=right | 5.9 km || 
|-id=072 bgcolor=#d6d6d6
| 196072 ||  || — || October 9, 2002 || Socorro || LINEAR || EUP || align=right | 7.6 km || 
|-id=073 bgcolor=#d6d6d6
| 196073 ||  || — || October 1, 2002 || Anderson Mesa || LONEOS || — || align=right | 5.4 km || 
|-id=074 bgcolor=#d6d6d6
| 196074 ||  || — || October 1, 2002 || Anderson Mesa || LONEOS || — || align=right | 5.7 km || 
|-id=075 bgcolor=#d6d6d6
| 196075 ||  || — || October 1, 2002 || Anderson Mesa || LONEOS || — || align=right | 5.1 km || 
|-id=076 bgcolor=#d6d6d6
| 196076 ||  || — || October 1, 2002 || Anderson Mesa || LONEOS || HYG || align=right | 4.7 km || 
|-id=077 bgcolor=#d6d6d6
| 196077 ||  || — || October 1, 2002 || Socorro || LINEAR || EUP || align=right | 6.9 km || 
|-id=078 bgcolor=#d6d6d6
| 196078 ||  || — || October 1, 2002 || Anderson Mesa || LONEOS || — || align=right | 6.8 km || 
|-id=079 bgcolor=#d6d6d6
| 196079 ||  || — || October 1, 2002 || Haleakala || NEAT || — || align=right | 6.5 km || 
|-id=080 bgcolor=#d6d6d6
| 196080 ||  || — || October 2, 2002 || Haleakala || NEAT || THB || align=right | 5.5 km || 
|-id=081 bgcolor=#d6d6d6
| 196081 ||  || — || October 2, 2002 || Haleakala || NEAT || 7:4 || align=right | 5.4 km || 
|-id=082 bgcolor=#d6d6d6
| 196082 ||  || — || October 2, 2002 || Campo Imperatore || CINEOS || — || align=right | 4.2 km || 
|-id=083 bgcolor=#d6d6d6
| 196083 ||  || — || October 3, 2002 || Socorro || LINEAR || THM || align=right | 5.4 km || 
|-id=084 bgcolor=#d6d6d6
| 196084 ||  || — || October 3, 2002 || Palomar || NEAT || — || align=right | 5.6 km || 
|-id=085 bgcolor=#d6d6d6
| 196085 ||  || — || October 3, 2002 || Palomar || NEAT || — || align=right | 5.3 km || 
|-id=086 bgcolor=#d6d6d6
| 196086 ||  || — || October 3, 2002 || Palomar || NEAT || — || align=right | 5.3 km || 
|-id=087 bgcolor=#d6d6d6
| 196087 ||  || — || October 1, 2002 || Anderson Mesa || LONEOS || — || align=right | 5.5 km || 
|-id=088 bgcolor=#d6d6d6
| 196088 ||  || — || October 4, 2002 || Socorro || LINEAR || — || align=right | 5.2 km || 
|-id=089 bgcolor=#d6d6d6
| 196089 ||  || — || October 4, 2002 || Socorro || LINEAR || — || align=right | 4.5 km || 
|-id=090 bgcolor=#d6d6d6
| 196090 ||  || — || October 4, 2002 || Socorro || LINEAR || EOS || align=right | 7.0 km || 
|-id=091 bgcolor=#d6d6d6
| 196091 ||  || — || October 4, 2002 || Socorro || LINEAR || — || align=right | 5.6 km || 
|-id=092 bgcolor=#d6d6d6
| 196092 ||  || — || October 3, 2002 || Palomar || NEAT || — || align=right | 6.5 km || 
|-id=093 bgcolor=#d6d6d6
| 196093 ||  || — || October 3, 2002 || Palomar || NEAT || — || align=right | 8.1 km || 
|-id=094 bgcolor=#d6d6d6
| 196094 ||  || — || October 3, 2002 || Palomar || NEAT || — || align=right | 6.0 km || 
|-id=095 bgcolor=#d6d6d6
| 196095 ||  || — || October 3, 2002 || Palomar || NEAT || EOS || align=right | 4.6 km || 
|-id=096 bgcolor=#d6d6d6
| 196096 ||  || — || October 3, 2002 || Palomar || NEAT || — || align=right | 5.4 km || 
|-id=097 bgcolor=#d6d6d6
| 196097 ||  || — || October 4, 2002 || Palomar || NEAT || — || align=right | 5.1 km || 
|-id=098 bgcolor=#d6d6d6
| 196098 ||  || — || October 4, 2002 || Palomar || NEAT || — || align=right | 7.2 km || 
|-id=099 bgcolor=#d6d6d6
| 196099 ||  || — || October 4, 2002 || Palomar || NEAT || — || align=right | 5.7 km || 
|-id=100 bgcolor=#d6d6d6
| 196100 ||  || — || October 4, 2002 || Socorro || LINEAR || HYG || align=right | 6.4 km || 
|}

196101–196200 

|-bgcolor=#d6d6d6
| 196101 ||  || — || October 4, 2002 || Palomar || NEAT || — || align=right | 3.8 km || 
|-id=102 bgcolor=#d6d6d6
| 196102 ||  || — || October 4, 2002 || Socorro || LINEAR || — || align=right | 6.2 km || 
|-id=103 bgcolor=#d6d6d6
| 196103 ||  || — || October 4, 2002 || Socorro || LINEAR || 7:4 || align=right | 7.3 km || 
|-id=104 bgcolor=#d6d6d6
| 196104 ||  || — || October 4, 2002 || Palomar || NEAT || — || align=right | 8.1 km || 
|-id=105 bgcolor=#d6d6d6
| 196105 ||  || — || October 4, 2002 || Anderson Mesa || LONEOS || URS || align=right | 6.0 km || 
|-id=106 bgcolor=#d6d6d6
| 196106 ||  || — || October 4, 2002 || Socorro || LINEAR || HYG || align=right | 4.9 km || 
|-id=107 bgcolor=#d6d6d6
| 196107 ||  || — || October 3, 2002 || Socorro || LINEAR || — || align=right | 3.7 km || 
|-id=108 bgcolor=#d6d6d6
| 196108 ||  || — || October 5, 2002 || Palomar || NEAT || — || align=right | 5.9 km || 
|-id=109 bgcolor=#d6d6d6
| 196109 ||  || — || October 5, 2002 || Palomar || NEAT || — || align=right | 5.1 km || 
|-id=110 bgcolor=#d6d6d6
| 196110 ||  || — || October 5, 2002 || Palomar || NEAT || — || align=right | 4.3 km || 
|-id=111 bgcolor=#d6d6d6
| 196111 ||  || — || October 3, 2002 || Socorro || LINEAR || EUP || align=right | 6.2 km || 
|-id=112 bgcolor=#d6d6d6
| 196112 ||  || — || October 3, 2002 || Palomar || NEAT || — || align=right | 7.8 km || 
|-id=113 bgcolor=#d6d6d6
| 196113 ||  || — || October 3, 2002 || Palomar || NEAT || — || align=right | 8.7 km || 
|-id=114 bgcolor=#d6d6d6
| 196114 ||  || — || October 3, 2002 || Palomar || NEAT || — || align=right | 5.7 km || 
|-id=115 bgcolor=#d6d6d6
| 196115 ||  || — || October 3, 2002 || Palomar || NEAT || — || align=right | 5.7 km || 
|-id=116 bgcolor=#d6d6d6
| 196116 ||  || — || October 3, 2002 || Palomar || NEAT || — || align=right | 5.9 km || 
|-id=117 bgcolor=#d6d6d6
| 196117 ||  || — || October 4, 2002 || Socorro || LINEAR || — || align=right | 5.6 km || 
|-id=118 bgcolor=#d6d6d6
| 196118 ||  || — || October 4, 2002 || Socorro || LINEAR || — || align=right | 4.9 km || 
|-id=119 bgcolor=#d6d6d6
| 196119 ||  || — || October 4, 2002 || Socorro || LINEAR || EOS || align=right | 4.1 km || 
|-id=120 bgcolor=#d6d6d6
| 196120 ||  || — || October 11, 2002 || Palomar || NEAT || — || align=right | 8.7 km || 
|-id=121 bgcolor=#d6d6d6
| 196121 ||  || — || October 4, 2002 || Socorro || LINEAR || — || align=right | 6.4 km || 
|-id=122 bgcolor=#d6d6d6
| 196122 ||  || — || October 3, 2002 || Socorro || LINEAR || — || align=right | 4.3 km || 
|-id=123 bgcolor=#d6d6d6
| 196123 ||  || — || October 3, 2002 || Socorro || LINEAR || — || align=right | 6.7 km || 
|-id=124 bgcolor=#d6d6d6
| 196124 ||  || — || October 3, 2002 || Socorro || LINEAR || — || align=right | 3.6 km || 
|-id=125 bgcolor=#d6d6d6
| 196125 ||  || — || October 4, 2002 || Socorro || LINEAR || EMA || align=right | 5.4 km || 
|-id=126 bgcolor=#d6d6d6
| 196126 ||  || — || October 4, 2002 || Socorro || LINEAR || HYG || align=right | 4.3 km || 
|-id=127 bgcolor=#d6d6d6
| 196127 ||  || — || October 4, 2002 || Socorro || LINEAR || — || align=right | 6.1 km || 
|-id=128 bgcolor=#d6d6d6
| 196128 ||  || — || October 4, 2002 || Socorro || LINEAR || ALA || align=right | 8.2 km || 
|-id=129 bgcolor=#d6d6d6
| 196129 ||  || — || October 7, 2002 || Socorro || LINEAR || — || align=right | 5.1 km || 
|-id=130 bgcolor=#d6d6d6
| 196130 ||  || — || October 3, 2002 || Socorro || LINEAR || — || align=right | 4.4 km || 
|-id=131 bgcolor=#d6d6d6
| 196131 ||  || — || October 8, 2002 || Anderson Mesa || LONEOS || — || align=right | 4.8 km || 
|-id=132 bgcolor=#d6d6d6
| 196132 ||  || — || October 8, 2002 || Palomar || NEAT || — || align=right | 7.7 km || 
|-id=133 bgcolor=#d6d6d6
| 196133 ||  || — || October 7, 2002 || Socorro || LINEAR || — || align=right | 5.2 km || 
|-id=134 bgcolor=#d6d6d6
| 196134 ||  || — || October 9, 2002 || Socorro || LINEAR || VER || align=right | 4.0 km || 
|-id=135 bgcolor=#d6d6d6
| 196135 ||  || — || October 7, 2002 || Socorro || LINEAR || — || align=right | 6.4 km || 
|-id=136 bgcolor=#d6d6d6
| 196136 ||  || — || October 7, 2002 || Palomar || NEAT || — || align=right | 4.8 km || 
|-id=137 bgcolor=#d6d6d6
| 196137 ||  || — || October 7, 2002 || Socorro || LINEAR || — || align=right | 6.3 km || 
|-id=138 bgcolor=#d6d6d6
| 196138 ||  || — || October 9, 2002 || Socorro || LINEAR || — || align=right | 6.7 km || 
|-id=139 bgcolor=#d6d6d6
| 196139 ||  || — || October 10, 2002 || Palomar || NEAT || KOR || align=right | 2.3 km || 
|-id=140 bgcolor=#d6d6d6
| 196140 ||  || — || October 10, 2002 || Socorro || LINEAR || — || align=right | 4.6 km || 
|-id=141 bgcolor=#d6d6d6
| 196141 ||  || — || October 9, 2002 || Socorro || LINEAR || — || align=right | 6.5 km || 
|-id=142 bgcolor=#d6d6d6
| 196142 ||  || — || October 9, 2002 || Socorro || LINEAR || — || align=right | 3.5 km || 
|-id=143 bgcolor=#d6d6d6
| 196143 ||  || — || October 9, 2002 || Socorro || LINEAR || EOS || align=right | 3.4 km || 
|-id=144 bgcolor=#d6d6d6
| 196144 ||  || — || October 9, 2002 || Socorro || LINEAR || HYG || align=right | 4.9 km || 
|-id=145 bgcolor=#d6d6d6
| 196145 ||  || — || October 10, 2002 || Socorro || LINEAR || SYL7:4 || align=right | 8.4 km || 
|-id=146 bgcolor=#d6d6d6
| 196146 ||  || — || October 10, 2002 || Socorro || LINEAR || — || align=right | 5.3 km || 
|-id=147 bgcolor=#d6d6d6
| 196147 ||  || — || October 13, 2002 || Palomar || NEAT || — || align=right | 6.8 km || 
|-id=148 bgcolor=#d6d6d6
| 196148 ||  || — || October 5, 2002 || Apache Point || SDSS || EOS || align=right | 3.0 km || 
|-id=149 bgcolor=#d6d6d6
| 196149 ||  || — || October 5, 2002 || Apache Point || SDSS || — || align=right | 3.6 km || 
|-id=150 bgcolor=#fefefe
| 196150 ||  || — || October 5, 2002 || Apache Point || SDSS || — || align=right data-sort-value="0.84" | 840 m || 
|-id=151 bgcolor=#d6d6d6
| 196151 ||  || — || October 28, 2002 || Palomar || NEAT || LUT || align=right | 6.4 km || 
|-id=152 bgcolor=#d6d6d6
| 196152 ||  || — || October 28, 2002 || Palomar || NEAT || — || align=right | 4.9 km || 
|-id=153 bgcolor=#d6d6d6
| 196153 ||  || — || October 30, 2002 || Haleakala || NEAT || EOS || align=right | 3.8 km || 
|-id=154 bgcolor=#d6d6d6
| 196154 ||  || — || October 31, 2002 || Socorro || LINEAR || EUP || align=right | 7.4 km || 
|-id=155 bgcolor=#d6d6d6
| 196155 ||  || — || October 29, 2002 || Apache Point || SDSS || — || align=right | 6.4 km || 
|-id=156 bgcolor=#d6d6d6
| 196156 ||  || — || October 30, 2002 || Apache Point || SDSS || EOS || align=right | 2.9 km || 
|-id=157 bgcolor=#d6d6d6
| 196157 ||  || — || October 30, 2002 || Apache Point || SDSS || — || align=right | 4.6 km || 
|-id=158 bgcolor=#d6d6d6
| 196158 ||  || — || November 1, 2002 || Socorro || LINEAR || THB || align=right | 7.2 km || 
|-id=159 bgcolor=#d6d6d6
| 196159 ||  || — || November 7, 2002 || Socorro || LINEAR || 7:4 || align=right | 6.5 km || 
|-id=160 bgcolor=#d6d6d6
| 196160 ||  || — || November 5, 2002 || Socorro || LINEAR || 7:4 || align=right | 7.0 km || 
|-id=161 bgcolor=#d6d6d6
| 196161 ||  || — || November 4, 2002 || Palomar || NEAT || 7:4 || align=right | 5.4 km || 
|-id=162 bgcolor=#fefefe
| 196162 ||  || — || November 5, 2002 || Palomar || NEAT || — || align=right data-sort-value="0.78" | 780 m || 
|-id=163 bgcolor=#d6d6d6
| 196163 ||  || — || November 4, 2002 || Palomar || NEAT || SYL7:4 || align=right | 6.7 km || 
|-id=164 bgcolor=#d6d6d6
| 196164 ||  || — || November 5, 2002 || Palomar || NEAT || — || align=right | 4.8 km || 
|-id=165 bgcolor=#d6d6d6
| 196165 ||  || — || November 6, 2002 || Anderson Mesa || LONEOS || — || align=right | 4.3 km || 
|-id=166 bgcolor=#d6d6d6
| 196166 ||  || — || November 6, 2002 || Socorro || LINEAR || — || align=right | 6.1 km || 
|-id=167 bgcolor=#d6d6d6
| 196167 ||  || — || November 6, 2002 || Haleakala || NEAT || — || align=right | 4.4 km || 
|-id=168 bgcolor=#d6d6d6
| 196168 ||  || — || November 6, 2002 || Socorro || LINEAR || — || align=right | 7.0 km || 
|-id=169 bgcolor=#d6d6d6
| 196169 ||  || — || November 8, 2002 || Socorro || LINEAR || — || align=right | 7.9 km || 
|-id=170 bgcolor=#d6d6d6
| 196170 ||  || — || November 7, 2002 || Socorro || LINEAR || — || align=right | 5.1 km || 
|-id=171 bgcolor=#d6d6d6
| 196171 ||  || — || November 11, 2002 || Socorro || LINEAR || — || align=right | 5.2 km || 
|-id=172 bgcolor=#d6d6d6
| 196172 ||  || — || November 10, 2002 || Socorro || LINEAR || EUP || align=right | 9.9 km || 
|-id=173 bgcolor=#d6d6d6
| 196173 ||  || — || November 12, 2002 || Socorro || LINEAR || EUP || align=right | 7.6 km || 
|-id=174 bgcolor=#FA8072
| 196174 ||  || — || November 28, 2002 || Anderson Mesa || LONEOS || — || align=right | 1.6 km || 
|-id=175 bgcolor=#fefefe
| 196175 ||  || — || December 1, 2002 || Socorro || LINEAR || FLO || align=right data-sort-value="0.71" | 710 m || 
|-id=176 bgcolor=#d6d6d6
| 196176 ||  || — || December 1, 2002 || Haleakala || NEAT || — || align=right | 3.9 km || 
|-id=177 bgcolor=#d6d6d6
| 196177 ||  || — || December 2, 2002 || Socorro || LINEAR || — || align=right | 5.6 km || 
|-id=178 bgcolor=#d6d6d6
| 196178 ||  || — || December 10, 2002 || Socorro || LINEAR || — || align=right | 6.2 km || 
|-id=179 bgcolor=#d6d6d6
| 196179 ||  || — || December 10, 2002 || Socorro || LINEAR || THM || align=right | 5.2 km || 
|-id=180 bgcolor=#fefefe
| 196180 ||  || — || December 11, 2002 || Socorro || LINEAR || — || align=right | 1.4 km || 
|-id=181 bgcolor=#fefefe
| 196181 ||  || — || December 7, 2002 || Apache Point || SDSS || FLO || align=right data-sort-value="0.95" | 950 m || 
|-id=182 bgcolor=#fefefe
| 196182 ||  || — || December 31, 2002 || Socorro || LINEAR || — || align=right data-sort-value="0.98" | 980 m || 
|-id=183 bgcolor=#fefefe
| 196183 ||  || — || December 31, 2002 || Socorro || LINEAR || FLO || align=right | 1.1 km || 
|-id=184 bgcolor=#fefefe
| 196184 ||  || — || December 31, 2002 || Socorro || LINEAR || — || align=right | 1.2 km || 
|-id=185 bgcolor=#fefefe
| 196185 ||  || — || December 31, 2002 || Socorro || LINEAR || — || align=right | 1.1 km || 
|-id=186 bgcolor=#d6d6d6
| 196186 ||  || — || December 31, 2002 || Socorro || LINEAR || HYG || align=right | 5.3 km || 
|-id=187 bgcolor=#fefefe
| 196187 ||  || — || December 31, 2002 || Kitt Peak || Spacewatch || — || align=right | 1.0 km || 
|-id=188 bgcolor=#d6d6d6
| 196188 ||  || — || January 1, 2003 || Kingsnake || J. V. McClusky || — || align=right | 3.0 km || 
|-id=189 bgcolor=#d6d6d6
| 196189 ||  || — || January 4, 2003 || Socorro || LINEAR || — || align=right | 5.6 km || 
|-id=190 bgcolor=#fefefe
| 196190 ||  || — || January 4, 2003 || Socorro || LINEAR || FLO || align=right | 1.0 km || 
|-id=191 bgcolor=#fefefe
| 196191 ||  || — || January 7, 2003 || Socorro || LINEAR || FLO || align=right data-sort-value="0.89" | 890 m || 
|-id=192 bgcolor=#fefefe
| 196192 ||  || — || January 7, 2003 || Socorro || LINEAR || — || align=right | 1.3 km || 
|-id=193 bgcolor=#fefefe
| 196193 ||  || — || January 7, 2003 || Socorro || LINEAR || FLO || align=right | 1.0 km || 
|-id=194 bgcolor=#fefefe
| 196194 ||  || — || January 5, 2003 || Socorro || LINEAR || — || align=right | 1.1 km || 
|-id=195 bgcolor=#d6d6d6
| 196195 ||  || — || January 5, 2003 || Socorro || LINEAR || — || align=right | 4.5 km || 
|-id=196 bgcolor=#fefefe
| 196196 ||  || — || January 5, 2003 || Socorro || LINEAR || FLO || align=right | 1.0 km || 
|-id=197 bgcolor=#fefefe
| 196197 ||  || — || January 10, 2003 || Socorro || LINEAR || — || align=right | 1.3 km || 
|-id=198 bgcolor=#fefefe
| 196198 ||  || — || January 5, 2003 || Socorro || LINEAR || FLO || align=right | 1.0 km || 
|-id=199 bgcolor=#fefefe
| 196199 || 2003 BA || — || January 16, 2003 || Palomar || NEAT || — || align=right | 1.4 km || 
|-id=200 bgcolor=#d6d6d6
| 196200 ||  || — || January 25, 2003 || Anderson Mesa || LONEOS || EUP || align=right | 8.9 km || 
|}

196201–196300 

|-bgcolor=#fefefe
| 196201 ||  || — || January 26, 2003 || Kitt Peak || Spacewatch || — || align=right | 1.1 km || 
|-id=202 bgcolor=#fefefe
| 196202 ||  || — || January 26, 2003 || Palomar || NEAT || — || align=right | 1.5 km || 
|-id=203 bgcolor=#fefefe
| 196203 ||  || — || January 26, 2003 || Palomar || NEAT || — || align=right | 2.5 km || 
|-id=204 bgcolor=#fefefe
| 196204 ||  || — || January 26, 2003 || Anderson Mesa || LONEOS || — || align=right | 1.2 km || 
|-id=205 bgcolor=#fefefe
| 196205 ||  || — || January 26, 2003 || Anderson Mesa || LONEOS || FLO || align=right | 1.1 km || 
|-id=206 bgcolor=#fefefe
| 196206 ||  || — || January 26, 2003 || Haleakala || NEAT || — || align=right | 1.2 km || 
|-id=207 bgcolor=#fefefe
| 196207 ||  || — || January 27, 2003 || Palomar || NEAT || FLO || align=right | 1.1 km || 
|-id=208 bgcolor=#fefefe
| 196208 ||  || — || January 27, 2003 || Anderson Mesa || LONEOS || — || align=right | 1.2 km || 
|-id=209 bgcolor=#fefefe
| 196209 ||  || — || January 27, 2003 || Socorro || LINEAR || FLO || align=right | 1.7 km || 
|-id=210 bgcolor=#fefefe
| 196210 ||  || — || January 25, 2003 || Palomar || NEAT || FLO || align=right | 1.5 km || 
|-id=211 bgcolor=#fefefe
| 196211 ||  || — || January 27, 2003 || Socorro || LINEAR || — || align=right | 2.3 km || 
|-id=212 bgcolor=#fefefe
| 196212 ||  || — || January 27, 2003 || Socorro || LINEAR || — || align=right | 1.0 km || 
|-id=213 bgcolor=#fefefe
| 196213 ||  || — || January 27, 2003 || Socorro || LINEAR || FLO || align=right data-sort-value="0.91" | 910 m || 
|-id=214 bgcolor=#fefefe
| 196214 ||  || — || January 28, 2003 || Kitt Peak || Spacewatch || — || align=right | 1.8 km || 
|-id=215 bgcolor=#fefefe
| 196215 ||  || — || January 27, 2003 || Anderson Mesa || LONEOS || FLO || align=right | 1.4 km || 
|-id=216 bgcolor=#fefefe
| 196216 ||  || — || January 27, 2003 || Socorro || LINEAR || — || align=right | 1.1 km || 
|-id=217 bgcolor=#d6d6d6
| 196217 ||  || — || January 29, 2003 || Palomar || NEAT || — || align=right | 5.3 km || 
|-id=218 bgcolor=#fefefe
| 196218 ||  || — || January 27, 2003 || Socorro || LINEAR || — || align=right | 1.4 km || 
|-id=219 bgcolor=#fefefe
| 196219 ||  || — || January 27, 2003 || Socorro || LINEAR || — || align=right | 1.1 km || 
|-id=220 bgcolor=#fefefe
| 196220 ||  || — || January 27, 2003 || Socorro || LINEAR || — || align=right | 1.0 km || 
|-id=221 bgcolor=#fefefe
| 196221 ||  || — || January 27, 2003 || Socorro || LINEAR || — || align=right | 1.1 km || 
|-id=222 bgcolor=#fefefe
| 196222 ||  || — || January 27, 2003 || Anderson Mesa || LONEOS || — || align=right | 1.6 km || 
|-id=223 bgcolor=#fefefe
| 196223 ||  || — || January 27, 2003 || Socorro || LINEAR || — || align=right data-sort-value="0.89" | 890 m || 
|-id=224 bgcolor=#fefefe
| 196224 ||  || — || January 27, 2003 || Haleakala || NEAT || — || align=right | 1.5 km || 
|-id=225 bgcolor=#fefefe
| 196225 ||  || — || January 27, 2003 || Socorro || LINEAR || — || align=right | 1.0 km || 
|-id=226 bgcolor=#fefefe
| 196226 ||  || — || January 28, 2003 || Socorro || LINEAR || — || align=right | 2.1 km || 
|-id=227 bgcolor=#fefefe
| 196227 ||  || — || January 28, 2003 || Palomar || NEAT || — || align=right | 1.1 km || 
|-id=228 bgcolor=#fefefe
| 196228 ||  || — || January 29, 2003 || Palomar || NEAT || FLO || align=right data-sort-value="0.80" | 800 m || 
|-id=229 bgcolor=#fefefe
| 196229 ||  || — || January 30, 2003 || Haleakala || NEAT || — || align=right | 1.9 km || 
|-id=230 bgcolor=#fefefe
| 196230 ||  || — || January 31, 2003 || Socorro || LINEAR || FLO || align=right | 1.6 km || 
|-id=231 bgcolor=#fefefe
| 196231 ||  || — || January 31, 2003 || Socorro || LINEAR || — || align=right | 1.1 km || 
|-id=232 bgcolor=#fefefe
| 196232 ||  || — || January 30, 2003 || Anderson Mesa || LONEOS || NYS || align=right data-sort-value="0.77" | 770 m || 
|-id=233 bgcolor=#fefefe
| 196233 ||  || — || January 25, 2003 || Kitt Peak || Spacewatch || — || align=right data-sort-value="0.71" | 710 m || 
|-id=234 bgcolor=#fefefe
| 196234 ||  || — || February 1, 2003 || Socorro || LINEAR || — || align=right | 1.2 km || 
|-id=235 bgcolor=#fefefe
| 196235 ||  || — || February 1, 2003 || Socorro || LINEAR || — || align=right | 1.3 km || 
|-id=236 bgcolor=#fefefe
| 196236 ||  || — || February 2, 2003 || Socorro || LINEAR || FLO || align=right | 1.7 km || 
|-id=237 bgcolor=#fefefe
| 196237 ||  || — || February 2, 2003 || Socorro || LINEAR || — || align=right | 1.2 km || 
|-id=238 bgcolor=#fefefe
| 196238 ||  || — || February 3, 2003 || Anderson Mesa || LONEOS || — || align=right | 1.8 km || 
|-id=239 bgcolor=#fefefe
| 196239 ||  || — || February 7, 2003 || Desert Eagle || W. K. Y. Yeung || FLO || align=right data-sort-value="0.94" | 940 m || 
|-id=240 bgcolor=#fefefe
| 196240 ||  || — || February 8, 2003 || Socorro || LINEAR || FLO || align=right data-sort-value="0.98" | 980 m || 
|-id=241 bgcolor=#fefefe
| 196241 ||  || — || February 8, 2003 || Socorro || LINEAR || FLO || align=right data-sort-value="0.87" | 870 m || 
|-id=242 bgcolor=#fefefe
| 196242 ||  || — || February 3, 2003 || Socorro || LINEAR || — || align=right data-sort-value="0.92" | 920 m || 
|-id=243 bgcolor=#fefefe
| 196243 ||  || — || February 22, 2003 || Desert Eagle || W. K. Y. Yeung || — || align=right | 1.5 km || 
|-id=244 bgcolor=#fefefe
| 196244 ||  || — || February 22, 2003 || Palomar || NEAT || — || align=right | 1.5 km || 
|-id=245 bgcolor=#fefefe
| 196245 ||  || — || February 24, 2003 || Campo Imperatore || CINEOS || FLO || align=right data-sort-value="0.81" | 810 m || 
|-id=246 bgcolor=#fefefe
| 196246 ||  || — || February 24, 2003 || Campo Imperatore || CINEOS || V || align=right data-sort-value="0.92" | 920 m || 
|-id=247 bgcolor=#fefefe
| 196247 ||  || — || February 25, 2003 || Campo Imperatore || CINEOS || — || align=right | 1.4 km || 
|-id=248 bgcolor=#fefefe
| 196248 ||  || — || February 26, 2003 || Haleakala || NEAT || — || align=right | 1.1 km || 
|-id=249 bgcolor=#fefefe
| 196249 ||  || — || February 26, 2003 || Haleakala || NEAT || NYS || align=right | 1.2 km || 
|-id=250 bgcolor=#fefefe
| 196250 ||  || — || February 22, 2003 || Goodricke-Pigott || J. W. Kessel || — || align=right | 1.5 km || 
|-id=251 bgcolor=#fefefe
| 196251 ||  || — || February 23, 2003 || Anderson Mesa || LONEOS || V || align=right | 1.1 km || 
|-id=252 bgcolor=#fefefe
| 196252 ||  || — || February 23, 2003 || Anderson Mesa || LONEOS || — || align=right | 1.2 km || 
|-id=253 bgcolor=#fefefe
| 196253 ||  || — || February 22, 2003 || Palomar || NEAT || V || align=right | 1.0 km || 
|-id=254 bgcolor=#fefefe
| 196254 ||  || — || February 23, 2003 || Kitt Peak || Spacewatch || NYS || align=right data-sort-value="0.79" | 790 m || 
|-id=255 bgcolor=#fefefe
| 196255 || 2003 EZ || — || March 5, 2003 || Socorro || LINEAR || — || align=right | 3.1 km || 
|-id=256 bgcolor=#FFC2E0
| 196256 ||  || — || March 6, 2003 || Anderson Mesa || LONEOS || AMO +1km || align=right | 2.0 km || 
|-id=257 bgcolor=#fefefe
| 196257 ||  || — || March 6, 2003 || Socorro || LINEAR || — || align=right | 2.4 km || 
|-id=258 bgcolor=#fefefe
| 196258 ||  || — || March 5, 2003 || Socorro || LINEAR || NYS || align=right data-sort-value="0.99" | 990 m || 
|-id=259 bgcolor=#fefefe
| 196259 ||  || — || March 6, 2003 || Anderson Mesa || LONEOS || — || align=right | 1.4 km || 
|-id=260 bgcolor=#fefefe
| 196260 ||  || — || March 6, 2003 || Anderson Mesa || LONEOS || — || align=right | 1.1 km || 
|-id=261 bgcolor=#fefefe
| 196261 ||  || — || March 6, 2003 || Anderson Mesa || LONEOS || NYS || align=right data-sort-value="0.90" | 900 m || 
|-id=262 bgcolor=#fefefe
| 196262 ||  || — || March 6, 2003 || Socorro || LINEAR || FLO || align=right | 2.6 km || 
|-id=263 bgcolor=#fefefe
| 196263 ||  || — || March 6, 2003 || Socorro || LINEAR || — || align=right | 1.4 km || 
|-id=264 bgcolor=#fefefe
| 196264 ||  || — || March 6, 2003 || Socorro || LINEAR || — || align=right | 1.7 km || 
|-id=265 bgcolor=#fefefe
| 196265 ||  || — || March 6, 2003 || Socorro || LINEAR || — || align=right | 2.4 km || 
|-id=266 bgcolor=#fefefe
| 196266 ||  || — || March 6, 2003 || Socorro || LINEAR || — || align=right | 1.1 km || 
|-id=267 bgcolor=#fefefe
| 196267 ||  || — || March 6, 2003 || Socorro || LINEAR || KLI || align=right | 2.5 km || 
|-id=268 bgcolor=#fefefe
| 196268 ||  || — || March 7, 2003 || Socorro || LINEAR || — || align=right | 1.3 km || 
|-id=269 bgcolor=#fefefe
| 196269 ||  || — || March 5, 2003 || Socorro || LINEAR || — || align=right | 1.5 km || 
|-id=270 bgcolor=#fefefe
| 196270 ||  || — || March 6, 2003 || Anderson Mesa || LONEOS || — || align=right | 1.4 km || 
|-id=271 bgcolor=#fefefe
| 196271 ||  || — || March 6, 2003 || Anderson Mesa || LONEOS || NYS || align=right data-sort-value="0.88" | 880 m || 
|-id=272 bgcolor=#fefefe
| 196272 ||  || — || March 6, 2003 || Anderson Mesa || LONEOS || NYS || align=right | 1.7 km || 
|-id=273 bgcolor=#fefefe
| 196273 ||  || — || March 6, 2003 || Socorro || LINEAR || FLO || align=right | 1.1 km || 
|-id=274 bgcolor=#fefefe
| 196274 ||  || — || March 6, 2003 || Socorro || LINEAR || — || align=right | 1.5 km || 
|-id=275 bgcolor=#fefefe
| 196275 ||  || — || March 6, 2003 || Socorro || LINEAR || NYS || align=right | 1.0 km || 
|-id=276 bgcolor=#fefefe
| 196276 ||  || — || March 6, 2003 || Socorro || LINEAR || NYS || align=right | 2.5 km || 
|-id=277 bgcolor=#fefefe
| 196277 ||  || — || March 6, 2003 || Anderson Mesa || LONEOS || — || align=right | 1.6 km || 
|-id=278 bgcolor=#fefefe
| 196278 ||  || — || March 6, 2003 || Anderson Mesa || LONEOS || NYS || align=right | 2.1 km || 
|-id=279 bgcolor=#fefefe
| 196279 ||  || — || March 6, 2003 || Socorro || LINEAR || — || align=right | 3.0 km || 
|-id=280 bgcolor=#fefefe
| 196280 ||  || — || March 6, 2003 || Socorro || LINEAR || NYS || align=right | 1.0 km || 
|-id=281 bgcolor=#fefefe
| 196281 ||  || — || March 6, 2003 || Socorro || LINEAR || — || align=right | 1.3 km || 
|-id=282 bgcolor=#fefefe
| 196282 ||  || — || March 7, 2003 || Socorro || LINEAR || FLO || align=right | 1.6 km || 
|-id=283 bgcolor=#fefefe
| 196283 ||  || — || March 7, 2003 || Anderson Mesa || LONEOS || FLO || align=right | 1.4 km || 
|-id=284 bgcolor=#fefefe
| 196284 ||  || — || March 7, 2003 || Anderson Mesa || LONEOS || MAS || align=right data-sort-value="0.90" | 900 m || 
|-id=285 bgcolor=#E9E9E9
| 196285 ||  || — || March 6, 2003 || Socorro || LINEAR || — || align=right | 1.6 km || 
|-id=286 bgcolor=#fefefe
| 196286 ||  || — || March 7, 2003 || Socorro || LINEAR || FLO || align=right data-sort-value="0.94" | 940 m || 
|-id=287 bgcolor=#fefefe
| 196287 ||  || — || March 7, 2003 || Socorro || LINEAR || V || align=right | 1.1 km || 
|-id=288 bgcolor=#fefefe
| 196288 ||  || — || March 9, 2003 || Socorro || LINEAR || NYS || align=right | 1.1 km || 
|-id=289 bgcolor=#fefefe
| 196289 ||  || — || March 9, 2003 || Socorro || LINEAR || FLO || align=right | 1.0 km || 
|-id=290 bgcolor=#fefefe
| 196290 ||  || — || March 10, 2003 || Anderson Mesa || LONEOS || — || align=right | 1.1 km || 
|-id=291 bgcolor=#fefefe
| 196291 ||  || — || March 9, 2003 || Socorro || LINEAR || — || align=right | 2.5 km || 
|-id=292 bgcolor=#fefefe
| 196292 ||  || — || March 8, 2003 || Socorro || LINEAR || — || align=right | 1.6 km || 
|-id=293 bgcolor=#fefefe
| 196293 ||  || — || March 11, 2003 || Palomar || NEAT || — || align=right | 1.3 km || 
|-id=294 bgcolor=#fefefe
| 196294 ||  || — || March 12, 2003 || Palomar || NEAT || — || align=right | 5.1 km || 
|-id=295 bgcolor=#fefefe
| 196295 ||  || — || March 6, 2003 || Anderson Mesa || LONEOS || — || align=right | 1.2 km || 
|-id=296 bgcolor=#E9E9E9
| 196296 ||  || — || March 12, 2003 || Kitt Peak || Spacewatch || — || align=right | 1.2 km || 
|-id=297 bgcolor=#fefefe
| 196297 || 2003 FA || — || March 21, 2003 || Wrightwood || J. W. Young || LCI || align=right | 1.1 km || 
|-id=298 bgcolor=#fefefe
| 196298 || 2003 FQ || — || March 22, 2003 || Kleť || J. Tichá, M. Tichý || — || align=right | 1.3 km || 
|-id=299 bgcolor=#fefefe
| 196299 ||  || — || March 24, 2003 || Haleakala || NEAT || — || align=right | 1.7 km || 
|-id=300 bgcolor=#E9E9E9
| 196300 ||  || — || March 23, 2003 || Haleakala || NEAT || — || align=right | 1.6 km || 
|}

196301–196400 

|-bgcolor=#fefefe
| 196301 ||  || — || March 27, 2003 || Campo Imperatore || CINEOS || V || align=right | 1.1 km || 
|-id=302 bgcolor=#fefefe
| 196302 ||  || — || March 23, 2003 || Kitt Peak || Spacewatch || — || align=right | 1.1 km || 
|-id=303 bgcolor=#fefefe
| 196303 ||  || — || March 24, 2003 || Kitt Peak || Spacewatch || NYS || align=right | 2.1 km || 
|-id=304 bgcolor=#fefefe
| 196304 ||  || — || March 23, 2003 || Catalina || CSS || V || align=right | 1.2 km || 
|-id=305 bgcolor=#fefefe
| 196305 ||  || — || March 23, 2003 || Kitt Peak || Spacewatch || NYS || align=right data-sort-value="0.97" | 970 m || 
|-id=306 bgcolor=#fefefe
| 196306 ||  || — || March 23, 2003 || Haleakala || NEAT || — || align=right | 1.2 km || 
|-id=307 bgcolor=#fefefe
| 196307 ||  || — || March 25, 2003 || Palomar || NEAT || — || align=right | 1.2 km || 
|-id=308 bgcolor=#fefefe
| 196308 ||  || — || March 23, 2003 || Kitt Peak || Spacewatch || MAS || align=right | 1.0 km || 
|-id=309 bgcolor=#fefefe
| 196309 ||  || — || March 23, 2003 || Kitt Peak || Spacewatch || EUT || align=right data-sort-value="0.95" | 950 m || 
|-id=310 bgcolor=#fefefe
| 196310 ||  || — || March 23, 2003 || Haleakala || NEAT || FLO || align=right | 1.4 km || 
|-id=311 bgcolor=#fefefe
| 196311 ||  || — || March 24, 2003 || Haleakala || NEAT || — || align=right | 1.6 km || 
|-id=312 bgcolor=#fefefe
| 196312 ||  || — || March 24, 2003 || Haleakala || NEAT || — || align=right | 1.3 km || 
|-id=313 bgcolor=#fefefe
| 196313 ||  || — || March 23, 2003 || Palomar || NEAT || — || align=right data-sort-value="0.96" | 960 m || 
|-id=314 bgcolor=#fefefe
| 196314 ||  || — || March 23, 2003 || Kitt Peak || Spacewatch || EUT || align=right | 1.2 km || 
|-id=315 bgcolor=#fefefe
| 196315 ||  || — || March 23, 2003 || Kitt Peak || Spacewatch || — || align=right | 2.0 km || 
|-id=316 bgcolor=#C2FFFF
| 196316 ||  || — || March 23, 2003 || Kitt Peak || Spacewatch || L4 || align=right | 12 km || 
|-id=317 bgcolor=#fefefe
| 196317 ||  || — || March 23, 2003 || Kitt Peak || Spacewatch || — || align=right | 1.4 km || 
|-id=318 bgcolor=#C2FFFF
| 196318 ||  || — || March 23, 2003 || Kitt Peak || Spacewatch || L4 || align=right | 12 km || 
|-id=319 bgcolor=#fefefe
| 196319 ||  || — || March 23, 2003 || Haleakala || NEAT || NYS || align=right | 1.1 km || 
|-id=320 bgcolor=#E9E9E9
| 196320 ||  || — || March 24, 2003 || Kitt Peak || Spacewatch || — || align=right | 1.5 km || 
|-id=321 bgcolor=#fefefe
| 196321 ||  || — || March 25, 2003 || Haleakala || NEAT || — || align=right | 2.0 km || 
|-id=322 bgcolor=#fefefe
| 196322 ||  || — || March 26, 2003 || Kitt Peak || Spacewatch || NYS || align=right | 1.2 km || 
|-id=323 bgcolor=#fefefe
| 196323 ||  || — || March 23, 2003 || Kitt Peak || Spacewatch || — || align=right | 2.4 km || 
|-id=324 bgcolor=#fefefe
| 196324 ||  || — || March 23, 2003 || Kitt Peak || Spacewatch || V || align=right | 1.2 km || 
|-id=325 bgcolor=#fefefe
| 196325 ||  || — || March 24, 2003 || Kitt Peak || Spacewatch || MAS || align=right | 1.00 km || 
|-id=326 bgcolor=#fefefe
| 196326 ||  || — || March 24, 2003 || Haleakala || NEAT || — || align=right | 1.4 km || 
|-id=327 bgcolor=#fefefe
| 196327 ||  || — || March 25, 2003 || Palomar || NEAT || — || align=right | 1.1 km || 
|-id=328 bgcolor=#fefefe
| 196328 ||  || — || March 25, 2003 || Haleakala || NEAT || NYS || align=right | 1.0 km || 
|-id=329 bgcolor=#fefefe
| 196329 ||  || — || March 25, 2003 || Haleakala || NEAT || — || align=right | 1.4 km || 
|-id=330 bgcolor=#fefefe
| 196330 ||  || — || March 26, 2003 || Palomar || NEAT || — || align=right data-sort-value="0.98" | 980 m || 
|-id=331 bgcolor=#fefefe
| 196331 ||  || — || March 26, 2003 || Palomar || NEAT || MAS || align=right | 1.0 km || 
|-id=332 bgcolor=#fefefe
| 196332 ||  || — || March 26, 2003 || Palomar || NEAT || — || align=right | 1.4 km || 
|-id=333 bgcolor=#fefefe
| 196333 ||  || — || March 26, 2003 || Palomar || NEAT || FLO || align=right | 1.7 km || 
|-id=334 bgcolor=#fefefe
| 196334 ||  || — || March 26, 2003 || Palomar || NEAT || — || align=right | 1.8 km || 
|-id=335 bgcolor=#fefefe
| 196335 ||  || — || March 26, 2003 || Palomar || NEAT || FLO || align=right | 1.8 km || 
|-id=336 bgcolor=#fefefe
| 196336 ||  || — || March 26, 2003 || Kitt Peak || Spacewatch || NYS || align=right | 1.0 km || 
|-id=337 bgcolor=#fefefe
| 196337 ||  || — || March 26, 2003 || Haleakala || NEAT || — || align=right | 1.7 km || 
|-id=338 bgcolor=#fefefe
| 196338 ||  || — || March 26, 2003 || Haleakala || NEAT || ERI || align=right | 3.0 km || 
|-id=339 bgcolor=#fefefe
| 196339 ||  || — || March 27, 2003 || Palomar || NEAT || NYS || align=right data-sort-value="0.84" | 840 m || 
|-id=340 bgcolor=#E9E9E9
| 196340 ||  || — || March 27, 2003 || Kitt Peak || Spacewatch || — || align=right | 2.0 km || 
|-id=341 bgcolor=#fefefe
| 196341 ||  || — || March 27, 2003 || Kitt Peak || Spacewatch || NYS || align=right | 2.0 km || 
|-id=342 bgcolor=#fefefe
| 196342 ||  || — || March 27, 2003 || Socorro || LINEAR || V || align=right | 1.6 km || 
|-id=343 bgcolor=#fefefe
| 196343 ||  || — || March 27, 2003 || Palomar || NEAT || — || align=right | 1.7 km || 
|-id=344 bgcolor=#fefefe
| 196344 ||  || — || March 27, 2003 || Palomar || NEAT || — || align=right | 1.3 km || 
|-id=345 bgcolor=#fefefe
| 196345 ||  || — || March 28, 2003 || Kitt Peak || Spacewatch || — || align=right | 2.7 km || 
|-id=346 bgcolor=#E9E9E9
| 196346 ||  || — || March 28, 2003 || Anderson Mesa || LONEOS || — || align=right | 4.8 km || 
|-id=347 bgcolor=#fefefe
| 196347 ||  || — || March 29, 2003 || Anderson Mesa || LONEOS || — || align=right | 1.3 km || 
|-id=348 bgcolor=#fefefe
| 196348 ||  || — || March 29, 2003 || Anderson Mesa || LONEOS || — || align=right | 1.3 km || 
|-id=349 bgcolor=#fefefe
| 196349 ||  || — || March 29, 2003 || Anderson Mesa || LONEOS || V || align=right | 1.2 km || 
|-id=350 bgcolor=#fefefe
| 196350 ||  || — || March 29, 2003 || Anderson Mesa || LONEOS || — || align=right | 1.4 km || 
|-id=351 bgcolor=#fefefe
| 196351 ||  || — || March 29, 2003 || Anderson Mesa || LONEOS || — || align=right | 1.4 km || 
|-id=352 bgcolor=#fefefe
| 196352 ||  || — || March 30, 2003 || Socorro || LINEAR || — || align=right | 1.3 km || 
|-id=353 bgcolor=#fefefe
| 196353 ||  || — || March 31, 2003 || Anderson Mesa || LONEOS || FLO || align=right data-sort-value="0.94" | 940 m || 
|-id=354 bgcolor=#fefefe
| 196354 ||  || — || March 31, 2003 || Kitt Peak || Spacewatch || — || align=right | 1.4 km || 
|-id=355 bgcolor=#fefefe
| 196355 ||  || — || March 31, 2003 || Kitt Peak || Spacewatch || — || align=right | 1.2 km || 
|-id=356 bgcolor=#fefefe
| 196356 ||  || — || March 24, 2003 || Kitt Peak || Spacewatch || — || align=right | 1.4 km || 
|-id=357 bgcolor=#fefefe
| 196357 ||  || — || March 25, 2003 || Haleakala || NEAT || — || align=right | 1.2 km || 
|-id=358 bgcolor=#fefefe
| 196358 ||  || — || March 25, 2003 || Haleakala || NEAT || EUT || align=right | 1.3 km || 
|-id=359 bgcolor=#fefefe
| 196359 ||  || — || March 26, 2003 || Kitt Peak || Spacewatch || — || align=right | 2.4 km || 
|-id=360 bgcolor=#fefefe
| 196360 ||  || — || March 27, 2003 || Anderson Mesa || LONEOS || NYS || align=right | 1.0 km || 
|-id=361 bgcolor=#fefefe
| 196361 ||  || — || March 27, 2003 || Anderson Mesa || LONEOS || NYS || align=right | 3.0 km || 
|-id=362 bgcolor=#fefefe
| 196362 ||  || — || March 31, 2003 || Anderson Mesa || LONEOS || NYS || align=right data-sort-value="0.99" | 990 m || 
|-id=363 bgcolor=#fefefe
| 196363 ||  || — || March 31, 2003 || Anderson Mesa || LONEOS || — || align=right | 1.5 km || 
|-id=364 bgcolor=#C2FFFF
| 196364 ||  || — || March 30, 2003 || Kitt Peak || Spacewatch || L4 || align=right | 15 km || 
|-id=365 bgcolor=#fefefe
| 196365 ||  || — || March 31, 2003 || Socorro || LINEAR || — || align=right | 1.2 km || 
|-id=366 bgcolor=#fefefe
| 196366 ||  || — || March 31, 2003 || Socorro || LINEAR || — || align=right | 2.6 km || 
|-id=367 bgcolor=#fefefe
| 196367 ||  || — || March 31, 2003 || Socorro || LINEAR || NYS || align=right | 1.1 km || 
|-id=368 bgcolor=#fefefe
| 196368 ||  || — || March 31, 2003 || Socorro || LINEAR || — || align=right | 1.5 km || 
|-id=369 bgcolor=#E9E9E9
| 196369 ||  || — || March 31, 2003 || Socorro || LINEAR || ADE || align=right | 3.9 km || 
|-id=370 bgcolor=#fefefe
| 196370 ||  || — || March 25, 2003 || Palomar || NEAT || — || align=right | 1.1 km || 
|-id=371 bgcolor=#fefefe
| 196371 ||  || — || March 25, 2003 || Palomar || NEAT || — || align=right | 2.9 km || 
|-id=372 bgcolor=#fefefe
| 196372 ||  || — || March 26, 2003 || Anderson Mesa || LONEOS || MAS || align=right | 1.5 km || 
|-id=373 bgcolor=#E9E9E9
| 196373 ||  || — || March 27, 2003 || Palomar || NEAT || fast? || align=right | 1.6 km || 
|-id=374 bgcolor=#fefefe
| 196374 ||  || — || March 25, 2003 || Palomar || NEAT || V || align=right | 1.1 km || 
|-id=375 bgcolor=#E9E9E9
| 196375 ||  || — || March 27, 2003 || Kitt Peak || Spacewatch || — || align=right | 1.9 km || 
|-id=376 bgcolor=#fefefe
| 196376 ||  || — || April 1, 2003 || Socorro || LINEAR || — || align=right | 1.7 km || 
|-id=377 bgcolor=#fefefe
| 196377 ||  || — || April 1, 2003 || Socorro || LINEAR || V || align=right data-sort-value="0.95" | 950 m || 
|-id=378 bgcolor=#fefefe
| 196378 ||  || — || April 1, 2003 || Palomar || NEAT || V || align=right data-sort-value="0.99" | 990 m || 
|-id=379 bgcolor=#fefefe
| 196379 ||  || — || April 1, 2003 || Socorro || LINEAR || — || align=right | 1.3 km || 
|-id=380 bgcolor=#fefefe
| 196380 ||  || — || April 1, 2003 || Socorro || LINEAR || NYS || align=right data-sort-value="0.92" | 920 m || 
|-id=381 bgcolor=#fefefe
| 196381 ||  || — || April 1, 2003 || Socorro || LINEAR || NYS || align=right | 1.0 km || 
|-id=382 bgcolor=#fefefe
| 196382 ||  || — || April 1, 2003 || Socorro || LINEAR || NYS || align=right | 1.0 km || 
|-id=383 bgcolor=#fefefe
| 196383 ||  || — || April 1, 2003 || Socorro || LINEAR || NYS || align=right | 1.1 km || 
|-id=384 bgcolor=#fefefe
| 196384 ||  || — || April 1, 2003 || Socorro || LINEAR || NYS || align=right | 1.0 km || 
|-id=385 bgcolor=#E9E9E9
| 196385 ||  || — || April 2, 2003 || Socorro || LINEAR || — || align=right | 1.8 km || 
|-id=386 bgcolor=#fefefe
| 196386 ||  || — || April 2, 2003 || Haleakala || NEAT || — || align=right | 1.5 km || 
|-id=387 bgcolor=#fefefe
| 196387 ||  || — || April 2, 2003 || Haleakala || NEAT || FLO || align=right | 1.7 km || 
|-id=388 bgcolor=#fefefe
| 196388 ||  || — || April 1, 2003 || Socorro || LINEAR || NYS || align=right | 1.3 km || 
|-id=389 bgcolor=#fefefe
| 196389 ||  || — || April 3, 2003 || Anderson Mesa || LONEOS || — || align=right | 1.2 km || 
|-id=390 bgcolor=#fefefe
| 196390 ||  || — || April 1, 2003 || Socorro || LINEAR || — || align=right | 1.5 km || 
|-id=391 bgcolor=#fefefe
| 196391 ||  || — || April 4, 2003 || Kitt Peak || Spacewatch || MAS || align=right data-sort-value="0.93" | 930 m || 
|-id=392 bgcolor=#fefefe
| 196392 ||  || — || April 3, 2003 || Anderson Mesa || LONEOS || — || align=right | 3.1 km || 
|-id=393 bgcolor=#fefefe
| 196393 ||  || — || April 4, 2003 || Socorro || LINEAR || — || align=right | 2.1 km || 
|-id=394 bgcolor=#E9E9E9
| 196394 ||  || — || April 4, 2003 || Anderson Mesa || LONEOS || — || align=right | 3.4 km || 
|-id=395 bgcolor=#fefefe
| 196395 ||  || — || April 5, 2003 || Kitt Peak || Spacewatch || MAS || align=right | 1.0 km || 
|-id=396 bgcolor=#fefefe
| 196396 ||  || — || April 7, 2003 || Kitt Peak || Spacewatch || V || align=right | 1.1 km || 
|-id=397 bgcolor=#fefefe
| 196397 ||  || — || April 4, 2003 || Kitt Peak || Spacewatch || NYS || align=right data-sort-value="0.96" | 960 m || 
|-id=398 bgcolor=#fefefe
| 196398 ||  || — || April 7, 2003 || Socorro || LINEAR || NYS || align=right | 1.3 km || 
|-id=399 bgcolor=#fefefe
| 196399 ||  || — || April 8, 2003 || Socorro || LINEAR || CIM || align=right | 3.3 km || 
|-id=400 bgcolor=#fefefe
| 196400 ||  || — || April 8, 2003 || Socorro || LINEAR || — || align=right | 1.2 km || 
|}

196401–196500 

|-bgcolor=#fefefe
| 196401 ||  || — || April 3, 2003 || Cerro Tololo || DLS || — || align=right | 2.2 km || 
|-id=402 bgcolor=#E9E9E9
| 196402 ||  || — || April 7, 2003 || Socorro || LINEAR || — || align=right | 1.6 km || 
|-id=403 bgcolor=#E9E9E9
| 196403 ||  || — || April 7, 2003 || Kvistaberg || UDAS || ADE || align=right | 3.4 km || 
|-id=404 bgcolor=#fefefe
| 196404 ||  || — || April 7, 2003 || Socorro || LINEAR || — || align=right | 1.4 km || 
|-id=405 bgcolor=#fefefe
| 196405 ||  || — || April 8, 2003 || Socorro || LINEAR || FLO || align=right | 1.1 km || 
|-id=406 bgcolor=#fefefe
| 196406 ||  || — || April 4, 2003 || Goodricke-Pigott || J. W. Kessel || NYS || align=right data-sort-value="0.91" | 910 m || 
|-id=407 bgcolor=#fefefe
| 196407 ||  || — || April 8, 2003 || Palomar || NEAT || — || align=right | 2.9 km || 
|-id=408 bgcolor=#C2FFFF
| 196408 ||  || — || April 8, 2003 || Socorro || LINEAR || L4 || align=right | 15 km || 
|-id=409 bgcolor=#E9E9E9
| 196409 ||  || — || April 9, 2003 || Palomar || NEAT || — || align=right | 1.2 km || 
|-id=410 bgcolor=#fefefe
| 196410 ||  || — || April 10, 2003 || Kitt Peak || Spacewatch || — || align=right | 1.5 km || 
|-id=411 bgcolor=#fefefe
| 196411 Umurhan ||  ||  || April 1, 2003 || Kitt Peak || M. W. Buie || — || align=right data-sort-value="0.89" | 890 m || 
|-id=412 bgcolor=#fefefe
| 196412 ||  || — || April 1, 2003 || Goodricke-Pigott || R. A. Tucker || — || align=right | 1.2 km || 
|-id=413 bgcolor=#fefefe
| 196413 ||  || — || April 3, 2003 || Anderson Mesa || LONEOS || V || align=right | 1.2 km || 
|-id=414 bgcolor=#E9E9E9
| 196414 ||  || — || April 5, 2003 || Kitt Peak || Spacewatch || — || align=right | 2.5 km || 
|-id=415 bgcolor=#fefefe
| 196415 || 2003 HE || — || April 21, 2003 || Siding Spring || R. H. McNaught || NYS || align=right data-sort-value="0.94" | 940 m || 
|-id=416 bgcolor=#E9E9E9
| 196416 ||  || — || April 23, 2003 || Campo Imperatore || CINEOS || — || align=right | 1.6 km || 
|-id=417 bgcolor=#fefefe
| 196417 ||  || — || April 21, 2003 || Catalina || CSS || V || align=right | 1.2 km || 
|-id=418 bgcolor=#fefefe
| 196418 ||  || — || April 24, 2003 || Haleakala || NEAT || V || align=right | 1.0 km || 
|-id=419 bgcolor=#E9E9E9
| 196419 ||  || — || April 24, 2003 || Anderson Mesa || LONEOS || — || align=right | 1.7 km || 
|-id=420 bgcolor=#E9E9E9
| 196420 ||  || — || April 24, 2003 || Anderson Mesa || LONEOS || — || align=right | 4.3 km || 
|-id=421 bgcolor=#fefefe
| 196421 ||  || — || April 25, 2003 || Kitt Peak || Spacewatch || MAS || align=right data-sort-value="0.87" | 870 m || 
|-id=422 bgcolor=#fefefe
| 196422 ||  || — || April 26, 2003 || Kitt Peak || Spacewatch || FLO || align=right data-sort-value="0.67" | 670 m || 
|-id=423 bgcolor=#fefefe
| 196423 ||  || — || April 26, 2003 || Kitt Peak || Spacewatch || V || align=right | 1.2 km || 
|-id=424 bgcolor=#E9E9E9
| 196424 ||  || — || April 26, 2003 || Socorro || LINEAR || — || align=right | 2.3 km || 
|-id=425 bgcolor=#fefefe
| 196425 ||  || — || April 26, 2003 || Haleakala || NEAT || — || align=right | 2.3 km || 
|-id=426 bgcolor=#E9E9E9
| 196426 ||  || — || April 26, 2003 || Haleakala || NEAT || — || align=right | 1.2 km || 
|-id=427 bgcolor=#E9E9E9
| 196427 ||  || — || April 26, 2003 || Haleakala || NEAT || — || align=right | 1.5 km || 
|-id=428 bgcolor=#fefefe
| 196428 ||  || — || April 24, 2003 || Anderson Mesa || LONEOS || NYS || align=right data-sort-value="0.96" | 960 m || 
|-id=429 bgcolor=#fefefe
| 196429 ||  || — || April 24, 2003 || Anderson Mesa || LONEOS || MAS || align=right | 1.2 km || 
|-id=430 bgcolor=#E9E9E9
| 196430 ||  || — || April 25, 2003 || Anderson Mesa || LONEOS || EUN || align=right | 1.7 km || 
|-id=431 bgcolor=#E9E9E9
| 196431 ||  || — || April 27, 2003 || Anderson Mesa || LONEOS || — || align=right | 3.3 km || 
|-id=432 bgcolor=#fefefe
| 196432 ||  || — || April 26, 2003 || Kitt Peak || Spacewatch || NYS || align=right data-sort-value="0.96" | 960 m || 
|-id=433 bgcolor=#fefefe
| 196433 ||  || — || April 26, 2003 || Haleakala || NEAT || — || align=right | 1.3 km || 
|-id=434 bgcolor=#E9E9E9
| 196434 ||  || — || April 28, 2003 || Anderson Mesa || LONEOS || — || align=right | 1.8 km || 
|-id=435 bgcolor=#fefefe
| 196435 ||  || — || April 28, 2003 || Anderson Mesa || LONEOS || — || align=right | 1.5 km || 
|-id=436 bgcolor=#fefefe
| 196436 ||  || — || April 28, 2003 || Socorro || LINEAR || NYS || align=right | 1.1 km || 
|-id=437 bgcolor=#fefefe
| 196437 ||  || — || April 28, 2003 || Socorro || LINEAR || — || align=right | 2.7 km || 
|-id=438 bgcolor=#fefefe
| 196438 ||  || — || April 26, 2003 || Kitt Peak || Spacewatch || MAS || align=right data-sort-value="0.94" | 940 m || 
|-id=439 bgcolor=#fefefe
| 196439 ||  || — || April 28, 2003 || Anderson Mesa || LONEOS || — || align=right | 1.4 km || 
|-id=440 bgcolor=#C2FFFF
| 196440 ||  || — || April 27, 2003 || Anderson Mesa || LONEOS || L4 || align=right | 13 km || 
|-id=441 bgcolor=#fefefe
| 196441 ||  || — || April 29, 2003 || Kitt Peak || Spacewatch || V || align=right data-sort-value="0.97" | 970 m || 
|-id=442 bgcolor=#fefefe
| 196442 ||  || — || April 26, 2003 || Haleakala || NEAT || — || align=right | 1.3 km || 
|-id=443 bgcolor=#fefefe
| 196443 ||  || — || April 26, 2003 || Haleakala || NEAT || — || align=right | 1.2 km || 
|-id=444 bgcolor=#fefefe
| 196444 ||  || — || April 28, 2003 || Anderson Mesa || LONEOS || — || align=right | 1.3 km || 
|-id=445 bgcolor=#E9E9E9
| 196445 ||  || — || April 28, 2003 || Anderson Mesa || LONEOS || — || align=right | 1.7 km || 
|-id=446 bgcolor=#fefefe
| 196446 ||  || — || April 29, 2003 || Socorro || LINEAR || — || align=right | 1.3 km || 
|-id=447 bgcolor=#fefefe
| 196447 ||  || — || April 29, 2003 || Kitt Peak || Spacewatch || — || align=right | 1.3 km || 
|-id=448 bgcolor=#fefefe
| 196448 ||  || — || April 27, 2003 || Anderson Mesa || LONEOS || — || align=right | 2.3 km || 
|-id=449 bgcolor=#fefefe
| 196449 ||  || — || April 28, 2003 || Socorro || LINEAR || NYS || align=right | 1.1 km || 
|-id=450 bgcolor=#fefefe
| 196450 ||  || — || April 28, 2003 || Socorro || LINEAR || PHO || align=right | 2.2 km || 
|-id=451 bgcolor=#fefefe
| 196451 ||  || — || April 29, 2003 || Anderson Mesa || LONEOS || MAS || align=right | 1.4 km || 
|-id=452 bgcolor=#E9E9E9
| 196452 ||  || — || April 30, 2003 || Socorro || LINEAR || — || align=right | 1.8 km || 
|-id=453 bgcolor=#E9E9E9
| 196453 ||  || — || April 30, 2003 || Socorro || LINEAR || — || align=right | 3.2 km || 
|-id=454 bgcolor=#E9E9E9
| 196454 ||  || — || April 28, 2003 || Socorro || LINEAR || — || align=right | 1.4 km || 
|-id=455 bgcolor=#E9E9E9
| 196455 ||  || — || April 30, 2003 || Kitt Peak || Spacewatch || MAR || align=right | 1.4 km || 
|-id=456 bgcolor=#E9E9E9
| 196456 ||  || — || April 29, 2003 || Kitt Peak || Spacewatch || JUN || align=right | 1.4 km || 
|-id=457 bgcolor=#fefefe
| 196457 ||  || — || April 30, 2003 || Kitt Peak || Spacewatch || — || align=right | 1.2 km || 
|-id=458 bgcolor=#E9E9E9
| 196458 ||  || — || April 29, 2003 || Anderson Mesa || LONEOS || — || align=right | 1.9 km || 
|-id=459 bgcolor=#fefefe
| 196459 ||  || — || April 29, 2003 || Anderson Mesa || LONEOS || MAS || align=right | 1.0 km || 
|-id=460 bgcolor=#E9E9E9
| 196460 ||  || — || April 30, 2003 || Reedy Creek || J. Broughton || — || align=right | 2.7 km || 
|-id=461 bgcolor=#fefefe
| 196461 ||  || — || April 21, 2003 || Kitt Peak || Spacewatch || — || align=right | 1.6 km || 
|-id=462 bgcolor=#fefefe
| 196462 ||  || — || April 24, 2003 || Anderson Mesa || LONEOS || MAS || align=right | 1.5 km || 
|-id=463 bgcolor=#fefefe
| 196463 ||  || — || April 25, 2003 || Kitt Peak || Spacewatch || — || align=right | 1.3 km || 
|-id=464 bgcolor=#fefefe
| 196464 ||  || — || April 26, 2003 || Kitt Peak || Spacewatch || NYS || align=right data-sort-value="0.92" | 920 m || 
|-id=465 bgcolor=#E9E9E9
| 196465 ||  || — || May 1, 2003 || Socorro || LINEAR || JUN || align=right | 1.5 km || 
|-id=466 bgcolor=#fefefe
| 196466 ||  || — || May 1, 2003 || Socorro || LINEAR || NYS || align=right | 1.1 km || 
|-id=467 bgcolor=#fefefe
| 196467 ||  || — || May 2, 2003 || Kitt Peak || Spacewatch || — || align=right | 1.5 km || 
|-id=468 bgcolor=#fefefe
| 196468 ||  || — || May 2, 2003 || Kitt Peak || Spacewatch || NYS || align=right | 1.1 km || 
|-id=469 bgcolor=#fefefe
| 196469 ||  || — || May 2, 2003 || Socorro || LINEAR || NYS || align=right data-sort-value="0.97" | 970 m || 
|-id=470 bgcolor=#fefefe
| 196470 ||  || — || May 2, 2003 || Socorro || LINEAR || — || align=right | 2.9 km || 
|-id=471 bgcolor=#fefefe
| 196471 ||  || — || May 3, 2003 || Kitt Peak || Spacewatch || V || align=right | 1.1 km || 
|-id=472 bgcolor=#fefefe
| 196472 ||  || — || May 5, 2003 || Kitt Peak || Spacewatch || MAS || align=right | 1.0 km || 
|-id=473 bgcolor=#E9E9E9
| 196473 ||  || — || May 5, 2003 || Socorro || LINEAR || — || align=right | 1.5 km || 
|-id=474 bgcolor=#E9E9E9
| 196474 ||  || — || May 5, 2003 || Socorro || LINEAR || — || align=right | 1.7 km || 
|-id=475 bgcolor=#fefefe
| 196475 ||  || — || May 6, 2003 || Kitt Peak || Spacewatch || NYS || align=right data-sort-value="0.93" | 930 m || 
|-id=476 bgcolor=#E9E9E9
| 196476 Humfernandez ||  ||  || May 2, 2003 || Mérida || I. R. Ferrín, C. Leal || — || align=right | 4.3 km || 
|-id=477 bgcolor=#E9E9E9
| 196477 ||  || — || May 2, 2003 || Kitt Peak || Spacewatch || — || align=right | 2.0 km || 
|-id=478 bgcolor=#fefefe
| 196478 || 2003 KC || — || May 20, 2003 || Nogales || M. Schwartz, P. R. Holvorcem || — || align=right | 1.7 km || 
|-id=479 bgcolor=#fefefe
| 196479 || 2003 KU || — || May 21, 2003 || Reedy Creek || J. Broughton || — || align=right | 1.4 km || 
|-id=480 bgcolor=#E9E9E9
| 196480 ||  || — || May 22, 2003 || Kitt Peak || Spacewatch || — || align=right | 2.5 km || 
|-id=481 bgcolor=#fefefe
| 196481 VATT ||  ||  || May 23, 2003 || Mount Graham || W. H. Ryan, C. T. Martinez || NYS || align=right data-sort-value="0.75" | 750 m || 
|-id=482 bgcolor=#E9E9E9
| 196482 ||  || — || May 23, 2003 || Reedy Creek || J. Broughton || — || align=right | 1.8 km || 
|-id=483 bgcolor=#fefefe
| 196483 ||  || — || May 25, 2003 || Kitt Peak || Spacewatch || — || align=right | 1.2 km || 
|-id=484 bgcolor=#E9E9E9
| 196484 ||  || — || May 24, 2003 || Reedy Creek || J. Broughton || RAF || align=right | 1.4 km || 
|-id=485 bgcolor=#fefefe
| 196485 ||  || — || May 25, 2003 || Kitt Peak || Spacewatch || — || align=right | 1.1 km || 
|-id=486 bgcolor=#fefefe
| 196486 ||  || — || May 27, 2003 || Anderson Mesa || LONEOS || NYS || align=right | 1.3 km || 
|-id=487 bgcolor=#E9E9E9
| 196487 ||  || — || May 27, 2003 || Anderson Mesa || LONEOS || — || align=right | 1.3 km || 
|-id=488 bgcolor=#C2FFFF
| 196488 ||  || — || May 26, 2003 || Kitt Peak || Spacewatch || L4 || align=right | 13 km || 
|-id=489 bgcolor=#E9E9E9
| 196489 ||  || — || May 28, 2003 || Socorro || LINEAR || BAR || align=right | 2.2 km || 
|-id=490 bgcolor=#E9E9E9
| 196490 ||  || — || May 26, 2003 || Kitt Peak || Spacewatch || — || align=right | 1.6 km || 
|-id=491 bgcolor=#E9E9E9
| 196491 ||  || — || May 26, 2003 || Haleakala || NEAT || GER || align=right | 4.6 km || 
|-id=492 bgcolor=#fefefe
| 196492 ||  || — || May 30, 2003 || Socorro || LINEAR || V || align=right | 1.1 km || 
|-id=493 bgcolor=#E9E9E9
| 196493 ||  || — || May 30, 2003 || Socorro || LINEAR || — || align=right | 1.8 km || 
|-id=494 bgcolor=#fefefe
| 196494 ||  || — || May 27, 2003 || Kitt Peak || Spacewatch || — || align=right data-sort-value="0.84" | 840 m || 
|-id=495 bgcolor=#E9E9E9
| 196495 ||  || — || June 1, 2003 || Kitt Peak || Spacewatch || — || align=right | 3.2 km || 
|-id=496 bgcolor=#fefefe
| 196496 ||  || — || June 1, 2003 || Kitt Peak || Spacewatch || — || align=right | 1.1 km || 
|-id=497 bgcolor=#E9E9E9
| 196497 ||  || — || June 5, 2003 || Reedy Creek || J. Broughton || ADE || align=right | 3.0 km || 
|-id=498 bgcolor=#E9E9E9
| 196498 ||  || — || June 2, 2003 || Kitt Peak || Spacewatch || EUN || align=right | 1.9 km || 
|-id=499 bgcolor=#E9E9E9
| 196499 ||  || — || June 4, 2003 || Goodricke-Pigott || J. W. Kessel || JUN || align=right | 1.8 km || 
|-id=500 bgcolor=#E9E9E9
| 196500 ||  || — || June 7, 2003 || Reedy Creek || J. Broughton || — || align=right | 2.1 km || 
|}

196501–196600 

|-bgcolor=#E9E9E9
| 196501 ||  || — || June 7, 2003 || Reedy Creek || J. Broughton || RAF || align=right | 1.7 km || 
|-id=502 bgcolor=#E9E9E9
| 196502 ||  || — || June 22, 2003 || Anderson Mesa || LONEOS || — || align=right | 4.6 km || 
|-id=503 bgcolor=#E9E9E9
| 196503 ||  || — || June 27, 2003 || Haleakala || NEAT || — || align=right | 5.2 km || 
|-id=504 bgcolor=#E9E9E9
| 196504 ||  || — || June 28, 2003 || Socorro || LINEAR || — || align=right | 2.2 km || 
|-id=505 bgcolor=#E9E9E9
| 196505 ||  || — || June 29, 2003 || Socorro || LINEAR || — || align=right | 3.7 km || 
|-id=506 bgcolor=#E9E9E9
| 196506 ||  || — || June 27, 2003 || Nogales || Tenagra II Obs. || GEF || align=right | 2.1 km || 
|-id=507 bgcolor=#E9E9E9
| 196507 ||  || — || June 29, 2003 || Socorro || LINEAR || — || align=right | 3.4 km || 
|-id=508 bgcolor=#E9E9E9
| 196508 ||  || — || June 22, 2003 || Anderson Mesa || LONEOS || — || align=right | 3.5 km || 
|-id=509 bgcolor=#E9E9E9
| 196509 ||  || — || June 25, 2003 || Socorro || LINEAR || — || align=right | 1.8 km || 
|-id=510 bgcolor=#E9E9E9
| 196510 ||  || — || July 2, 2003 || Socorro || LINEAR || — || align=right | 3.4 km || 
|-id=511 bgcolor=#E9E9E9
| 196511 ||  || — || July 1, 2003 || Socorro || LINEAR || — || align=right | 1.8 km || 
|-id=512 bgcolor=#E9E9E9
| 196512 ||  || — || July 2, 2003 || Socorro || LINEAR || — || align=right | 3.4 km || 
|-id=513 bgcolor=#E9E9E9
| 196513 ||  || — || July 4, 2003 || Reedy Creek || J. Broughton || CLO || align=right | 3.6 km || 
|-id=514 bgcolor=#E9E9E9
| 196514 ||  || — || July 4, 2003 || Haleakala || NEAT || — || align=right | 2.3 km || 
|-id=515 bgcolor=#E9E9E9
| 196515 ||  || — || July 3, 2003 || Kitt Peak || Spacewatch || — || align=right | 3.3 km || 
|-id=516 bgcolor=#d6d6d6
| 196516 || 2003 OJ || — || July 18, 2003 || Siding Spring || R. H. McNaught || — || align=right | 3.6 km || 
|-id=517 bgcolor=#E9E9E9
| 196517 || 2003 OP || — || July 20, 2003 || Reedy Creek || J. Broughton || — || align=right | 1.7 km || 
|-id=518 bgcolor=#E9E9E9
| 196518 ||  || — || July 22, 2003 || Campo Imperatore || CINEOS || — || align=right | 3.4 km || 
|-id=519 bgcolor=#E9E9E9
| 196519 ||  || — || July 22, 2003 || Haleakala || NEAT || — || align=right | 3.3 km || 
|-id=520 bgcolor=#E9E9E9
| 196520 ||  || — || July 23, 2003 || Socorro || LINEAR || — || align=right | 4.1 km || 
|-id=521 bgcolor=#E9E9E9
| 196521 ||  || — || July 23, 2003 || Palomar || NEAT || EUN || align=right | 1.7 km || 
|-id=522 bgcolor=#E9E9E9
| 196522 ||  || — || July 25, 2003 || Socorro || LINEAR || ADE || align=right | 3.7 km || 
|-id=523 bgcolor=#E9E9E9
| 196523 ||  || — || July 23, 2003 || Palomar || NEAT || — || align=right | 3.1 km || 
|-id=524 bgcolor=#E9E9E9
| 196524 ||  || — || July 23, 2003 || Palomar || NEAT || — || align=right | 2.8 km || 
|-id=525 bgcolor=#E9E9E9
| 196525 ||  || — || July 23, 2003 || Palomar || NEAT || — || align=right | 2.9 km || 
|-id=526 bgcolor=#E9E9E9
| 196526 ||  || — || July 23, 2003 || Palomar || NEAT || GEF || align=right | 2.2 km || 
|-id=527 bgcolor=#E9E9E9
| 196527 ||  || — || July 30, 2003 || Reedy Creek || J. Broughton || — || align=right | 4.3 km || 
|-id=528 bgcolor=#E9E9E9
| 196528 ||  || — || July 24, 2003 || Campo Imperatore || CINEOS || — || align=right | 3.1 km || 
|-id=529 bgcolor=#E9E9E9
| 196529 ||  || — || July 30, 2003 || Needville || W. G. Dillon, P. Garossino || GEF || align=right | 1.7 km || 
|-id=530 bgcolor=#d6d6d6
| 196530 ||  || — || July 30, 2003 || Campo Imperatore || CINEOS || — || align=right | 4.9 km || 
|-id=531 bgcolor=#E9E9E9
| 196531 ||  || — || July 30, 2003 || Campo Imperatore || CINEOS || — || align=right | 2.8 km || 
|-id=532 bgcolor=#E9E9E9
| 196532 ||  || — || July 31, 2003 || Reedy Creek || J. Broughton || — || align=right | 1.8 km || 
|-id=533 bgcolor=#E9E9E9
| 196533 ||  || — || July 26, 2003 || Socorro || LINEAR || — || align=right | 5.4 km || 
|-id=534 bgcolor=#E9E9E9
| 196534 ||  || — || July 28, 2003 || Campo Imperatore || CINEOS || EUN || align=right | 2.3 km || 
|-id=535 bgcolor=#E9E9E9
| 196535 ||  || — || July 24, 2003 || Palomar || NEAT || — || align=right | 3.8 km || 
|-id=536 bgcolor=#E9E9E9
| 196536 ||  || — || July 24, 2003 || Palomar || NEAT || HEN || align=right | 2.3 km || 
|-id=537 bgcolor=#E9E9E9
| 196537 ||  || — || July 24, 2003 || Palomar || NEAT || — || align=right | 3.2 km || 
|-id=538 bgcolor=#d6d6d6
| 196538 ||  || — || July 24, 2003 || Palomar || NEAT || — || align=right | 4.5 km || 
|-id=539 bgcolor=#d6d6d6
| 196539 ||  || — || July 24, 2003 || Palomar || NEAT || — || align=right | 3.2 km || 
|-id=540 bgcolor=#E9E9E9
| 196540 Weinbaum ||  ||  || July 31, 2003 || Saint-Sulpice || B. Christophe || — || align=right | 2.9 km || 
|-id=541 bgcolor=#E9E9E9
| 196541 ||  || — || July 24, 2003 || Palomar || NEAT || AGN || align=right | 1.7 km || 
|-id=542 bgcolor=#E9E9E9
| 196542 || 2003 PZ || — || August 1, 2003 || Socorro || LINEAR || CLO || align=right | 3.8 km || 
|-id=543 bgcolor=#E9E9E9
| 196543 ||  || — || August 1, 2003 || Haleakala || NEAT || DOR || align=right | 3.6 km || 
|-id=544 bgcolor=#E9E9E9
| 196544 ||  || — || August 1, 2003 || Haleakala || NEAT || — || align=right | 4.8 km || 
|-id=545 bgcolor=#E9E9E9
| 196545 ||  || — || August 2, 2003 || Haleakala || NEAT || — || align=right | 3.4 km || 
|-id=546 bgcolor=#E9E9E9
| 196546 ||  || — || August 1, 2003 || Socorro || LINEAR || JUN || align=right | 1.7 km || 
|-id=547 bgcolor=#E9E9E9
| 196547 ||  || — || August 20, 2003 || Campo Imperatore || CINEOS || — || align=right | 2.8 km || 
|-id=548 bgcolor=#E9E9E9
| 196548 ||  || — || August 19, 2003 || Campo Imperatore || CINEOS || — || align=right | 3.3 km || 
|-id=549 bgcolor=#E9E9E9
| 196549 ||  || — || August 17, 2003 || Haleakala || NEAT || — || align=right | 3.5 km || 
|-id=550 bgcolor=#E9E9E9
| 196550 ||  || — || August 20, 2003 || Haleakala || NEAT || — || align=right | 4.7 km || 
|-id=551 bgcolor=#E9E9E9
| 196551 ||  || — || August 20, 2003 || Campo Imperatore || CINEOS || — || align=right | 2.5 km || 
|-id=552 bgcolor=#E9E9E9
| 196552 ||  || — || August 20, 2003 || Campo Imperatore || CINEOS || AGN || align=right | 2.2 km || 
|-id=553 bgcolor=#d6d6d6
| 196553 ||  || — || August 21, 2003 || Palomar || NEAT || — || align=right | 5.7 km || 
|-id=554 bgcolor=#E9E9E9
| 196554 ||  || — || August 18, 2003 || Campo Imperatore || CINEOS || AGN || align=right | 1.7 km || 
|-id=555 bgcolor=#E9E9E9
| 196555 ||  || — || August 20, 2003 || Reedy Creek || J. Broughton || — || align=right | 3.1 km || 
|-id=556 bgcolor=#E9E9E9
| 196556 ||  || — || August 22, 2003 || Socorro || LINEAR || WIT || align=right | 1.8 km || 
|-id=557 bgcolor=#E9E9E9
| 196557 ||  || — || August 22, 2003 || Haleakala || NEAT || HOF || align=right | 5.7 km || 
|-id=558 bgcolor=#E9E9E9
| 196558 ||  || — || August 22, 2003 || Haleakala || NEAT || MRX || align=right | 2.3 km || 
|-id=559 bgcolor=#E9E9E9
| 196559 ||  || — || August 22, 2003 || Haleakala || NEAT || AGN || align=right | 2.2 km || 
|-id=560 bgcolor=#E9E9E9
| 196560 ||  || — || August 20, 2003 || Palomar || NEAT || — || align=right | 3.6 km || 
|-id=561 bgcolor=#E9E9E9
| 196561 ||  || — || August 20, 2003 || Palomar || NEAT || — || align=right | 3.7 km || 
|-id=562 bgcolor=#E9E9E9
| 196562 ||  || — || August 22, 2003 || Palomar || NEAT || — || align=right | 3.6 km || 
|-id=563 bgcolor=#E9E9E9
| 196563 ||  || — || August 22, 2003 || Palomar || NEAT || — || align=right | 3.9 km || 
|-id=564 bgcolor=#E9E9E9
| 196564 ||  || — || August 22, 2003 || Palomar || NEAT || — || align=right | 2.7 km || 
|-id=565 bgcolor=#d6d6d6
| 196565 ||  || — || August 22, 2003 || Palomar || NEAT || — || align=right | 6.3 km || 
|-id=566 bgcolor=#E9E9E9
| 196566 ||  || — || August 21, 2003 || Palomar || NEAT || — || align=right | 1.5 km || 
|-id=567 bgcolor=#d6d6d6
| 196567 ||  || — || August 22, 2003 || Palomar || NEAT || URS || align=right | 6.1 km || 
|-id=568 bgcolor=#E9E9E9
| 196568 ||  || — || August 23, 2003 || Palomar || NEAT || — || align=right | 2.9 km || 
|-id=569 bgcolor=#d6d6d6
| 196569 ||  || — || August 23, 2003 || Socorro || LINEAR || EOS || align=right | 3.6 km || 
|-id=570 bgcolor=#E9E9E9
| 196570 ||  || — || August 21, 2003 || Palomar || NEAT || — || align=right | 3.7 km || 
|-id=571 bgcolor=#E9E9E9
| 196571 ||  || — || August 21, 2003 || Palomar || NEAT || — || align=right | 3.4 km || 
|-id=572 bgcolor=#E9E9E9
| 196572 ||  || — || August 21, 2003 || Palomar || NEAT || PAD || align=right | 4.2 km || 
|-id=573 bgcolor=#E9E9E9
| 196573 ||  || — || August 22, 2003 || Palomar || NEAT || HOF || align=right | 4.9 km || 
|-id=574 bgcolor=#E9E9E9
| 196574 ||  || — || August 22, 2003 || Socorro || LINEAR || — || align=right | 4.0 km || 
|-id=575 bgcolor=#E9E9E9
| 196575 ||  || — || August 22, 2003 || Socorro || LINEAR || DOR || align=right | 3.5 km || 
|-id=576 bgcolor=#E9E9E9
| 196576 ||  || — || August 22, 2003 || Socorro || LINEAR || — || align=right | 4.0 km || 
|-id=577 bgcolor=#E9E9E9
| 196577 ||  || — || August 22, 2003 || Socorro || LINEAR || — || align=right | 3.6 km || 
|-id=578 bgcolor=#E9E9E9
| 196578 ||  || — || August 22, 2003 || Socorro || LINEAR || — || align=right | 2.7 km || 
|-id=579 bgcolor=#E9E9E9
| 196579 ||  || — || August 22, 2003 || Socorro || LINEAR || — || align=right | 4.1 km || 
|-id=580 bgcolor=#d6d6d6
| 196580 ||  || — || August 22, 2003 || Socorro || LINEAR || — || align=right | 7.0 km || 
|-id=581 bgcolor=#E9E9E9
| 196581 ||  || — || August 23, 2003 || Palomar || NEAT || — || align=right | 3.9 km || 
|-id=582 bgcolor=#E9E9E9
| 196582 ||  || — || August 24, 2003 || Palomar || NEAT || — || align=right | 3.6 km || 
|-id=583 bgcolor=#d6d6d6
| 196583 ||  || — || August 20, 2003 || Campo Imperatore || CINEOS || — || align=right | 3.3 km || 
|-id=584 bgcolor=#E9E9E9
| 196584 ||  || — || August 21, 2003 || Campo Imperatore || CINEOS || — || align=right | 4.2 km || 
|-id=585 bgcolor=#d6d6d6
| 196585 ||  || — || August 22, 2003 || Palomar || NEAT || — || align=right | 3.2 km || 
|-id=586 bgcolor=#E9E9E9
| 196586 ||  || — || August 22, 2003 || Palomar || NEAT || — || align=right | 5.3 km || 
|-id=587 bgcolor=#E9E9E9
| 196587 ||  || — || August 22, 2003 || Haleakala || NEAT || DOR || align=right | 5.5 km || 
|-id=588 bgcolor=#d6d6d6
| 196588 ||  || — || August 22, 2003 || Palomar || NEAT || CHA || align=right | 3.6 km || 
|-id=589 bgcolor=#E9E9E9
| 196589 ||  || — || August 22, 2003 || Palomar || NEAT || — || align=right | 3.9 km || 
|-id=590 bgcolor=#d6d6d6
| 196590 ||  || — || August 23, 2003 || Socorro || LINEAR || KOR || align=right | 2.8 km || 
|-id=591 bgcolor=#E9E9E9
| 196591 ||  || — || August 23, 2003 || Socorro || LINEAR || — || align=right | 3.9 km || 
|-id=592 bgcolor=#E9E9E9
| 196592 ||  || — || August 23, 2003 || Socorro || LINEAR || — || align=right | 3.7 km || 
|-id=593 bgcolor=#E9E9E9
| 196593 ||  || — || August 23, 2003 || Socorro || LINEAR || MRX || align=right | 2.3 km || 
|-id=594 bgcolor=#E9E9E9
| 196594 ||  || — || August 23, 2003 || Socorro || LINEAR || — || align=right | 2.3 km || 
|-id=595 bgcolor=#E9E9E9
| 196595 ||  || — || August 23, 2003 || Palomar || NEAT || AGN || align=right | 2.1 km || 
|-id=596 bgcolor=#E9E9E9
| 196596 ||  || — || August 23, 2003 || Palomar || NEAT || EUN || align=right | 1.9 km || 
|-id=597 bgcolor=#E9E9E9
| 196597 ||  || — || August 22, 2003 || Socorro || LINEAR || GEF || align=right | 1.8 km || 
|-id=598 bgcolor=#E9E9E9
| 196598 ||  || — || August 22, 2003 || Palomar || NEAT || — || align=right | 4.8 km || 
|-id=599 bgcolor=#E9E9E9
| 196599 ||  || — || August 23, 2003 || Palomar || NEAT || — || align=right | 3.2 km || 
|-id=600 bgcolor=#E9E9E9
| 196600 ||  || — || August 25, 2003 || Socorro || LINEAR || AEO || align=right | 1.4 km || 
|}

196601–196700 

|-bgcolor=#fefefe
| 196601 ||  || — || August 25, 2003 || Reedy Creek || J. Broughton || H || align=right | 1.1 km || 
|-id=602 bgcolor=#E9E9E9
| 196602 ||  || — || August 23, 2003 || Socorro || LINEAR || — || align=right | 1.6 km || 
|-id=603 bgcolor=#E9E9E9
| 196603 ||  || — || August 23, 2003 || Palomar || NEAT || — || align=right | 1.5 km || 
|-id=604 bgcolor=#E9E9E9
| 196604 ||  || — || August 24, 2003 || Socorro || LINEAR || — || align=right | 3.9 km || 
|-id=605 bgcolor=#E9E9E9
| 196605 ||  || — || August 24, 2003 || Socorro || LINEAR || — || align=right | 4.8 km || 
|-id=606 bgcolor=#E9E9E9
| 196606 ||  || — || August 24, 2003 || Socorro || LINEAR || INO || align=right | 1.9 km || 
|-id=607 bgcolor=#d6d6d6
| 196607 ||  || — || August 24, 2003 || Socorro || LINEAR || — || align=right | 2.7 km || 
|-id=608 bgcolor=#E9E9E9
| 196608 ||  || — || August 24, 2003 || Socorro || LINEAR || — || align=right | 4.4 km || 
|-id=609 bgcolor=#fefefe
| 196609 ||  || — || August 24, 2003 || Socorro || LINEAR || H || align=right | 1.1 km || 
|-id=610 bgcolor=#d6d6d6
| 196610 ||  || — || August 25, 2003 || Socorro || LINEAR || — || align=right | 4.0 km || 
|-id=611 bgcolor=#d6d6d6
| 196611 ||  || — || August 24, 2003 || Socorro || LINEAR || — || align=right | 3.8 km || 
|-id=612 bgcolor=#E9E9E9
| 196612 ||  || — || August 27, 2003 || Haleakala || NEAT || — || align=right | 4.5 km || 
|-id=613 bgcolor=#E9E9E9
| 196613 ||  || — || August 28, 2003 || Socorro || LINEAR || — || align=right | 3.0 km || 
|-id=614 bgcolor=#E9E9E9
| 196614 ||  || — || August 30, 2003 || Kitt Peak || Spacewatch || — || align=right | 2.6 km || 
|-id=615 bgcolor=#E9E9E9
| 196615 ||  || — || August 31, 2003 || Socorro || LINEAR || — || align=right | 2.0 km || 
|-id=616 bgcolor=#fefefe
| 196616 ||  || — || August 31, 2003 || Socorro || LINEAR || H || align=right | 1.1 km || 
|-id=617 bgcolor=#d6d6d6
| 196617 ||  || — || August 31, 2003 || Kitt Peak || Spacewatch || — || align=right | 6.5 km || 
|-id=618 bgcolor=#E9E9E9
| 196618 ||  || — || August 26, 2003 || Socorro || LINEAR || HOF || align=right | 4.2 km || 
|-id=619 bgcolor=#E9E9E9
| 196619 ||  || — || September 1, 2003 || Socorro || LINEAR || HOF || align=right | 4.1 km || 
|-id=620 bgcolor=#E9E9E9
| 196620 ||  || — || September 3, 2003 || Socorro || LINEAR || — || align=right | 3.0 km || 
|-id=621 bgcolor=#E9E9E9
| 196621 ||  || — || September 1, 2003 || Socorro || LINEAR || DOR || align=right | 4.2 km || 
|-id=622 bgcolor=#E9E9E9
| 196622 ||  || — || September 1, 2003 || Socorro || LINEAR || DOR || align=right | 5.3 km || 
|-id=623 bgcolor=#d6d6d6
| 196623 ||  || — || September 2, 2003 || Socorro || LINEAR || BRA || align=right | 3.2 km || 
|-id=624 bgcolor=#E9E9E9
| 196624 ||  || — || September 4, 2003 || Kitt Peak || Spacewatch || — || align=right | 2.9 km || 
|-id=625 bgcolor=#FFC2E0
| 196625 ||  || — || September 13, 2003 || Anderson Mesa || LONEOS || APOPHAcritical || align=right data-sort-value="0.32" | 320 m || 
|-id=626 bgcolor=#E9E9E9
| 196626 ||  || — || September 13, 2003 || Haleakala || NEAT || DOR || align=right | 5.7 km || 
|-id=627 bgcolor=#E9E9E9
| 196627 ||  || — || September 13, 2003 || Haleakala || NEAT || — || align=right | 3.2 km || 
|-id=628 bgcolor=#E9E9E9
| 196628 ||  || — || September 15, 2003 || Palomar || NEAT || GEF || align=right | 1.9 km || 
|-id=629 bgcolor=#d6d6d6
| 196629 ||  || — || September 15, 2003 || Anderson Mesa || LONEOS || — || align=right | 4.2 km || 
|-id=630 bgcolor=#d6d6d6
| 196630 ||  || — || September 15, 2003 || Anderson Mesa || LONEOS || — || align=right | 3.4 km || 
|-id=631 bgcolor=#E9E9E9
| 196631 ||  || — || September 14, 2003 || Haleakala || NEAT || — || align=right | 4.1 km || 
|-id=632 bgcolor=#d6d6d6
| 196632 ||  || — || September 16, 2003 || Kitt Peak || Spacewatch || — || align=right | 2.7 km || 
|-id=633 bgcolor=#E9E9E9
| 196633 ||  || — || September 16, 2003 || Kitt Peak || Spacewatch || NEM || align=right | 2.8 km || 
|-id=634 bgcolor=#d6d6d6
| 196634 ||  || — || September 16, 2003 || Palomar || NEAT || — || align=right | 6.0 km || 
|-id=635 bgcolor=#E9E9E9
| 196635 ||  || — || September 16, 2003 || Palomar || NEAT || WIT || align=right | 1.8 km || 
|-id=636 bgcolor=#d6d6d6
| 196636 ||  || — || September 16, 2003 || Kitt Peak || Spacewatch || KOR || align=right | 1.8 km || 
|-id=637 bgcolor=#d6d6d6
| 196637 ||  || — || September 16, 2003 || Kitt Peak || Spacewatch || KOR || align=right | 2.1 km || 
|-id=638 bgcolor=#d6d6d6
| 196638 ||  || — || September 17, 2003 || Kitt Peak || Spacewatch || EOS || align=right | 5.2 km || 
|-id=639 bgcolor=#d6d6d6
| 196639 ||  || — || September 16, 2003 || Kitt Peak || Spacewatch || KOR || align=right | 2.5 km || 
|-id=640 bgcolor=#E9E9E9
| 196640 Mulhacén ||  ||  || September 17, 2003 || Heppenheim || F. Hormuth || — || align=right | 2.9 km || 
|-id=641 bgcolor=#d6d6d6
| 196641 ||  || — || September 17, 2003 || Kvistaberg || UDAS || — || align=right | 3.5 km || 
|-id=642 bgcolor=#d6d6d6
| 196642 ||  || — || September 17, 2003 || Kitt Peak || Spacewatch || EOS || align=right | 3.1 km || 
|-id=643 bgcolor=#d6d6d6
| 196643 ||  || — || September 16, 2003 || Kitt Peak || Spacewatch || — || align=right | 3.7 km || 
|-id=644 bgcolor=#d6d6d6
| 196644 ||  || — || September 17, 2003 || Kitt Peak || Spacewatch || — || align=right | 4.1 km || 
|-id=645 bgcolor=#d6d6d6
| 196645 ||  || — || September 17, 2003 || Kitt Peak || Spacewatch || — || align=right | 3.5 km || 
|-id=646 bgcolor=#E9E9E9
| 196646 ||  || — || September 17, 2003 || Kitt Peak || Spacewatch || MRX || align=right | 2.0 km || 
|-id=647 bgcolor=#E9E9E9
| 196647 ||  || — || September 17, 2003 || Kitt Peak || Spacewatch || — || align=right | 4.2 km || 
|-id=648 bgcolor=#d6d6d6
| 196648 ||  || — || September 17, 2003 || Kitt Peak || Spacewatch || — || align=right | 3.2 km || 
|-id=649 bgcolor=#d6d6d6
| 196649 ||  || — || September 17, 2003 || Haleakala || NEAT || — || align=right | 4.2 km || 
|-id=650 bgcolor=#d6d6d6
| 196650 ||  || — || September 17, 2003 || Haleakala || NEAT || TEL || align=right | 2.1 km || 
|-id=651 bgcolor=#E9E9E9
| 196651 ||  || — || September 18, 2003 || Palomar || NEAT || — || align=right | 4.3 km || 
|-id=652 bgcolor=#d6d6d6
| 196652 ||  || — || September 18, 2003 || Palomar || NEAT || — || align=right | 4.4 km || 
|-id=653 bgcolor=#E9E9E9
| 196653 ||  || — || September 18, 2003 || Kitt Peak || Spacewatch || — || align=right | 4.5 km || 
|-id=654 bgcolor=#E9E9E9
| 196654 ||  || — || September 18, 2003 || Palomar || NEAT || PAD || align=right | 2.4 km || 
|-id=655 bgcolor=#d6d6d6
| 196655 ||  || — || September 18, 2003 || Kitt Peak || Spacewatch || KOR || align=right | 2.1 km || 
|-id=656 bgcolor=#d6d6d6
| 196656 ||  || — || September 18, 2003 || Kitt Peak || Spacewatch || — || align=right | 4.7 km || 
|-id=657 bgcolor=#d6d6d6
| 196657 ||  || — || September 18, 2003 || Socorro || LINEAR || — || align=right | 3.8 km || 
|-id=658 bgcolor=#E9E9E9
| 196658 ||  || — || September 16, 2003 || Palomar || NEAT || — || align=right | 4.4 km || 
|-id=659 bgcolor=#d6d6d6
| 196659 ||  || — || September 16, 2003 || Palomar || NEAT || CHA || align=right | 3.8 km || 
|-id=660 bgcolor=#d6d6d6
| 196660 ||  || — || September 16, 2003 || Palomar || NEAT || — || align=right | 3.6 km || 
|-id=661 bgcolor=#d6d6d6
| 196661 ||  || — || September 17, 2003 || Palomar || NEAT || EUP || align=right | 5.9 km || 
|-id=662 bgcolor=#d6d6d6
| 196662 ||  || — || September 16, 2003 || Anderson Mesa || LONEOS || — || align=right | 6.0 km || 
|-id=663 bgcolor=#E9E9E9
| 196663 ||  || — || September 16, 2003 || Anderson Mesa || LONEOS || — || align=right | 4.5 km || 
|-id=664 bgcolor=#d6d6d6
| 196664 ||  || — || September 16, 2003 || Anderson Mesa || LONEOS || KOR || align=right | 2.5 km || 
|-id=665 bgcolor=#d6d6d6
| 196665 ||  || — || September 16, 2003 || Anderson Mesa || LONEOS || — || align=right | 4.7 km || 
|-id=666 bgcolor=#E9E9E9
| 196666 ||  || — || September 16, 2003 || Anderson Mesa || LONEOS || — || align=right | 2.6 km || 
|-id=667 bgcolor=#E9E9E9
| 196667 ||  || — || September 18, 2003 || Palomar || NEAT || — || align=right | 2.7 km || 
|-id=668 bgcolor=#E9E9E9
| 196668 ||  || — || September 18, 2003 || Palomar || NEAT || MAR || align=right | 1.8 km || 
|-id=669 bgcolor=#d6d6d6
| 196669 ||  || — || September 18, 2003 || Palomar || NEAT || FIR || align=right | 5.4 km || 
|-id=670 bgcolor=#d6d6d6
| 196670 ||  || — || September 19, 2003 || Palomar || NEAT || — || align=right | 5.2 km || 
|-id=671 bgcolor=#E9E9E9
| 196671 ||  || — || September 16, 2003 || Kitt Peak || Spacewatch || GEF || align=right | 1.7 km || 
|-id=672 bgcolor=#d6d6d6
| 196672 ||  || — || September 16, 2003 || Anderson Mesa || LONEOS || — || align=right | 5.1 km || 
|-id=673 bgcolor=#E9E9E9
| 196673 ||  || — || September 16, 2003 || Anderson Mesa || LONEOS || — || align=right | 4.8 km || 
|-id=674 bgcolor=#E9E9E9
| 196674 ||  || — || September 16, 2003 || Kitt Peak || Spacewatch || WIT || align=right | 1.6 km || 
|-id=675 bgcolor=#E9E9E9
| 196675 ||  || — || September 16, 2003 || Kitt Peak || Spacewatch || — || align=right | 3.4 km || 
|-id=676 bgcolor=#E9E9E9
| 196676 ||  || — || September 17, 2003 || Anderson Mesa || LONEOS || — || align=right | 3.8 km || 
|-id=677 bgcolor=#E9E9E9
| 196677 ||  || — || September 17, 2003 || Kitt Peak || Spacewatch || — || align=right | 2.7 km || 
|-id=678 bgcolor=#E9E9E9
| 196678 ||  || — || September 17, 2003 || Socorro || LINEAR || XIZ || align=right | 2.5 km || 
|-id=679 bgcolor=#d6d6d6
| 196679 ||  || — || September 17, 2003 || Socorro || LINEAR || CRO || align=right | 4.4 km || 
|-id=680 bgcolor=#d6d6d6
| 196680 ||  || — || September 17, 2003 || Kitt Peak || Spacewatch || — || align=right | 3.9 km || 
|-id=681 bgcolor=#d6d6d6
| 196681 ||  || — || September 17, 2003 || Črni Vrh || Črni Vrh || KOR || align=right | 2.0 km || 
|-id=682 bgcolor=#d6d6d6
| 196682 ||  || — || September 18, 2003 || Campo Imperatore || CINEOS || NAE || align=right | 5.6 km || 
|-id=683 bgcolor=#d6d6d6
| 196683 ||  || — || September 18, 2003 || Campo Imperatore || CINEOS || — || align=right | 4.9 km || 
|-id=684 bgcolor=#d6d6d6
| 196684 ||  || — || September 18, 2003 || Campo Imperatore || CINEOS || — || align=right | 3.5 km || 
|-id=685 bgcolor=#d6d6d6
| 196685 ||  || — || September 18, 2003 || Campo Imperatore || CINEOS || KOR || align=right | 2.1 km || 
|-id=686 bgcolor=#E9E9E9
| 196686 ||  || — || September 18, 2003 || Campo Imperatore || CINEOS || — || align=right | 4.2 km || 
|-id=687 bgcolor=#d6d6d6
| 196687 ||  || — || September 18, 2003 || Anderson Mesa || LONEOS || — || align=right | 6.1 km || 
|-id=688 bgcolor=#E9E9E9
| 196688 ||  || — || September 18, 2003 || Campo Imperatore || CINEOS || — || align=right | 4.1 km || 
|-id=689 bgcolor=#E9E9E9
| 196689 ||  || — || September 16, 2003 || Haleakala || NEAT || MAR || align=right | 1.9 km || 
|-id=690 bgcolor=#d6d6d6
| 196690 ||  || — || September 17, 2003 || Kitt Peak || Spacewatch || — || align=right | 3.4 km || 
|-id=691 bgcolor=#E9E9E9
| 196691 ||  || — || September 17, 2003 || Haleakala || NEAT || GEF || align=right | 2.2 km || 
|-id=692 bgcolor=#E9E9E9
| 196692 ||  || — || September 18, 2003 || Kitt Peak || Spacewatch || — || align=right | 3.3 km || 
|-id=693 bgcolor=#d6d6d6
| 196693 ||  || — || September 18, 2003 || Kitt Peak || Spacewatch || — || align=right | 4.6 km || 
|-id=694 bgcolor=#E9E9E9
| 196694 ||  || — || September 18, 2003 || Kitt Peak || Spacewatch || — || align=right | 1.5 km || 
|-id=695 bgcolor=#d6d6d6
| 196695 ||  || — || September 18, 2003 || Kitt Peak || Spacewatch || — || align=right | 3.5 km || 
|-id=696 bgcolor=#E9E9E9
| 196696 ||  || — || September 18, 2003 || Kitt Peak || Spacewatch || — || align=right | 3.9 km || 
|-id=697 bgcolor=#E9E9E9
| 196697 ||  || — || September 19, 2003 || Kitt Peak || Spacewatch || — || align=right | 1.9 km || 
|-id=698 bgcolor=#E9E9E9
| 196698 ||  || — || September 19, 2003 || Kitt Peak || Spacewatch || — || align=right | 3.7 km || 
|-id=699 bgcolor=#d6d6d6
| 196699 ||  || — || September 19, 2003 || Kitt Peak || Spacewatch || — || align=right | 5.4 km || 
|-id=700 bgcolor=#d6d6d6
| 196700 ||  || — || September 19, 2003 || Kitt Peak || Spacewatch || — || align=right | 5.1 km || 
|}

196701–196800 

|-bgcolor=#d6d6d6
| 196701 ||  || — || September 17, 2003 || Kitt Peak || Spacewatch || — || align=right | 2.9 km || 
|-id=702 bgcolor=#d6d6d6
| 196702 ||  || — || September 18, 2003 || Kitt Peak || Spacewatch || CHA || align=right | 3.1 km || 
|-id=703 bgcolor=#E9E9E9
| 196703 ||  || — || September 18, 2003 || Kitt Peak || Spacewatch || — || align=right | 3.1 km || 
|-id=704 bgcolor=#E9E9E9
| 196704 ||  || — || September 16, 2003 || Palomar || NEAT || — || align=right | 4.4 km || 
|-id=705 bgcolor=#d6d6d6
| 196705 ||  || — || September 16, 2003 || Kitt Peak || Spacewatch || — || align=right | 5.1 km || 
|-id=706 bgcolor=#E9E9E9
| 196706 ||  || — || September 17, 2003 || Palomar || NEAT || INO || align=right | 2.2 km || 
|-id=707 bgcolor=#E9E9E9
| 196707 ||  || — || September 18, 2003 || Socorro || LINEAR || — || align=right | 4.3 km || 
|-id=708 bgcolor=#E9E9E9
| 196708 ||  || — || September 18, 2003 || Kitt Peak || Spacewatch || — || align=right | 3.3 km || 
|-id=709 bgcolor=#d6d6d6
| 196709 ||  || — || September 18, 2003 || Kitt Peak || Spacewatch || — || align=right | 4.3 km || 
|-id=710 bgcolor=#d6d6d6
| 196710 ||  || — || September 18, 2003 || Črni Vrh || Črni Vrh || — || align=right | 5.0 km || 
|-id=711 bgcolor=#E9E9E9
| 196711 ||  || — || September 19, 2003 || Kitt Peak || Spacewatch || AST || align=right | 3.1 km || 
|-id=712 bgcolor=#d6d6d6
| 196712 ||  || — || September 19, 2003 || Kitt Peak || Spacewatch || — || align=right | 5.7 km || 
|-id=713 bgcolor=#d6d6d6
| 196713 ||  || — || September 20, 2003 || Palomar || NEAT || — || align=right | 5.3 km || 
|-id=714 bgcolor=#d6d6d6
| 196714 ||  || — || September 20, 2003 || Socorro || LINEAR || EOS || align=right | 3.7 km || 
|-id=715 bgcolor=#d6d6d6
| 196715 ||  || — || September 20, 2003 || Socorro || LINEAR || — || align=right | 3.6 km || 
|-id=716 bgcolor=#d6d6d6
| 196716 ||  || — || September 20, 2003 || Socorro || LINEAR || — || align=right | 3.8 km || 
|-id=717 bgcolor=#d6d6d6
| 196717 ||  || — || September 20, 2003 || Haleakala || NEAT || — || align=right | 4.9 km || 
|-id=718 bgcolor=#d6d6d6
| 196718 ||  || — || September 20, 2003 || Socorro || LINEAR || — || align=right | 5.3 km || 
|-id=719 bgcolor=#d6d6d6
| 196719 ||  || — || September 20, 2003 || Palomar || NEAT || — || align=right | 6.1 km || 
|-id=720 bgcolor=#E9E9E9
| 196720 ||  || — || September 20, 2003 || Palomar || NEAT || — || align=right | 4.4 km || 
|-id=721 bgcolor=#d6d6d6
| 196721 ||  || — || September 20, 2003 || Kitt Peak || Spacewatch || — || align=right | 6.6 km || 
|-id=722 bgcolor=#d6d6d6
| 196722 ||  || — || September 20, 2003 || Kitt Peak || Spacewatch || EOS || align=right | 3.4 km || 
|-id=723 bgcolor=#d6d6d6
| 196723 ||  || — || September 20, 2003 || Palomar || NEAT || — || align=right | 5.8 km || 
|-id=724 bgcolor=#d6d6d6
| 196724 ||  || — || September 16, 2003 || Socorro || LINEAR || — || align=right | 3.5 km || 
|-id=725 bgcolor=#E9E9E9
| 196725 ||  || — || September 16, 2003 || Palomar || NEAT || — || align=right | 4.4 km || 
|-id=726 bgcolor=#d6d6d6
| 196726 ||  || — || September 16, 2003 || Palomar || NEAT || IMH || align=right | 3.4 km || 
|-id=727 bgcolor=#E9E9E9
| 196727 ||  || — || September 16, 2003 || Palomar || NEAT || — || align=right | 4.3 km || 
|-id=728 bgcolor=#E9E9E9
| 196728 ||  || — || September 17, 2003 || Anderson Mesa || LONEOS || — || align=right | 3.9 km || 
|-id=729 bgcolor=#E9E9E9
| 196729 ||  || — || September 17, 2003 || Kitt Peak || Spacewatch || AGN || align=right | 1.7 km || 
|-id=730 bgcolor=#E9E9E9
| 196730 ||  || — || September 17, 2003 || Kitt Peak || Spacewatch || — || align=right | 3.7 km || 
|-id=731 bgcolor=#d6d6d6
| 196731 ||  || — || September 17, 2003 || Kitt Peak || Spacewatch || — || align=right | 4.1 km || 
|-id=732 bgcolor=#E9E9E9
| 196732 ||  || — || September 17, 2003 || Haleakala || NEAT || — || align=right | 4.7 km || 
|-id=733 bgcolor=#E9E9E9
| 196733 ||  || — || September 17, 2003 || Campo Imperatore || CINEOS || — || align=right | 3.2 km || 
|-id=734 bgcolor=#d6d6d6
| 196734 ||  || — || September 19, 2003 || Palomar || NEAT || — || align=right | 3.8 km || 
|-id=735 bgcolor=#d6d6d6
| 196735 ||  || — || September 19, 2003 || Palomar || NEAT || — || align=right | 6.3 km || 
|-id=736 bgcolor=#E9E9E9
| 196736 Munkácsy ||  ||  || September 19, 2003 || Piszkéstető || K. Sárneczky, B. Sipőcz || — || align=right | 2.5 km || 
|-id=737 bgcolor=#d6d6d6
| 196737 ||  || — || September 20, 2003 || Socorro || LINEAR || — || align=right | 5.8 km || 
|-id=738 bgcolor=#d6d6d6
| 196738 ||  || — || September 20, 2003 || Campo Imperatore || CINEOS || — || align=right | 4.8 km || 
|-id=739 bgcolor=#d6d6d6
| 196739 ||  || — || September 18, 2003 || Socorro || LINEAR || KAR || align=right | 2.4 km || 
|-id=740 bgcolor=#d6d6d6
| 196740 ||  || — || September 19, 2003 || Socorro || LINEAR || — || align=right | 4.5 km || 
|-id=741 bgcolor=#E9E9E9
| 196741 ||  || — || September 20, 2003 || Palomar || NEAT || — || align=right | 2.4 km || 
|-id=742 bgcolor=#E9E9E9
| 196742 ||  || — || September 21, 2003 || Campo Imperatore || CINEOS || HEN || align=right | 2.0 km || 
|-id=743 bgcolor=#d6d6d6
| 196743 ||  || — || September 21, 2003 || Socorro || LINEAR || — || align=right | 8.3 km || 
|-id=744 bgcolor=#d6d6d6
| 196744 ||  || — || September 18, 2003 || Kitt Peak || Spacewatch || EOS || align=right | 2.6 km || 
|-id=745 bgcolor=#d6d6d6
| 196745 ||  || — || September 18, 2003 || Palomar || NEAT || KOR || align=right | 2.4 km || 
|-id=746 bgcolor=#d6d6d6
| 196746 ||  || — || September 20, 2003 || Socorro || LINEAR || — || align=right | 4.3 km || 
|-id=747 bgcolor=#E9E9E9
| 196747 ||  || — || September 21, 2003 || Socorro || LINEAR || — || align=right | 3.6 km || 
|-id=748 bgcolor=#d6d6d6
| 196748 ||  || — || September 21, 2003 || Kitt Peak || Spacewatch || — || align=right | 4.2 km || 
|-id=749 bgcolor=#d6d6d6
| 196749 ||  || — || September 19, 2003 || Palomar || NEAT || — || align=right | 6.7 km || 
|-id=750 bgcolor=#d6d6d6
| 196750 ||  || — || September 16, 2003 || Kitt Peak || Spacewatch || — || align=right | 6.1 km || 
|-id=751 bgcolor=#E9E9E9
| 196751 ||  || — || September 16, 2003 || Kitt Peak || Spacewatch || AGN || align=right | 1.8 km || 
|-id=752 bgcolor=#d6d6d6
| 196752 ||  || — || September 16, 2003 || Kitt Peak || Spacewatch || KOR || align=right | 2.4 km || 
|-id=753 bgcolor=#d6d6d6
| 196753 ||  || — || September 17, 2003 || Socorro || LINEAR || — || align=right | 3.6 km || 
|-id=754 bgcolor=#E9E9E9
| 196754 ||  || — || September 18, 2003 || Socorro || LINEAR || PAD || align=right | 4.3 km || 
|-id=755 bgcolor=#d6d6d6
| 196755 ||  || — || September 19, 2003 || Anderson Mesa || LONEOS || — || align=right | 4.5 km || 
|-id=756 bgcolor=#fefefe
| 196756 ||  || — || September 19, 2003 || Anderson Mesa || LONEOS || H || align=right data-sort-value="0.70" | 700 m || 
|-id=757 bgcolor=#E9E9E9
| 196757 ||  || — || September 19, 2003 || Anderson Mesa || LONEOS || WIT || align=right | 1.6 km || 
|-id=758 bgcolor=#d6d6d6
| 196758 ||  || — || September 19, 2003 || Anderson Mesa || LONEOS || — || align=right | 3.9 km || 
|-id=759 bgcolor=#d6d6d6
| 196759 ||  || — || September 19, 2003 || Anderson Mesa || LONEOS || EOS || align=right | 3.4 km || 
|-id=760 bgcolor=#E9E9E9
| 196760 ||  || — || September 22, 2003 || Kitt Peak || Spacewatch || — || align=right | 3.4 km || 
|-id=761 bgcolor=#d6d6d6
| 196761 ||  || — || September 19, 2003 || Kitt Peak || Spacewatch || — || align=right | 4.3 km || 
|-id=762 bgcolor=#d6d6d6
| 196762 ||  || — || September 19, 2003 || Socorro || LINEAR || — || align=right | 5.2 km || 
|-id=763 bgcolor=#d6d6d6
| 196763 ||  || — || September 19, 2003 || Kitt Peak || Spacewatch || THM || align=right | 3.7 km || 
|-id=764 bgcolor=#d6d6d6
| 196764 ||  || — || September 19, 2003 || Kitt Peak || Spacewatch || TEL || align=right | 2.0 km || 
|-id=765 bgcolor=#E9E9E9
| 196765 ||  || — || September 19, 2003 || Kitt Peak || Spacewatch || WIT || align=right | 2.0 km || 
|-id=766 bgcolor=#E9E9E9
| 196766 ||  || — || September 19, 2003 || Kitt Peak || Spacewatch || AGN || align=right | 2.1 km || 
|-id=767 bgcolor=#E9E9E9
| 196767 ||  || — || September 20, 2003 || Anderson Mesa || LONEOS || MRX || align=right | 1.9 km || 
|-id=768 bgcolor=#d6d6d6
| 196768 ||  || — || September 20, 2003 || Anderson Mesa || LONEOS || — || align=right | 5.8 km || 
|-id=769 bgcolor=#d6d6d6
| 196769 ||  || — || September 20, 2003 || Anderson Mesa || LONEOS || — || align=right | 3.4 km || 
|-id=770 bgcolor=#E9E9E9
| 196770 ||  || — || September 22, 2003 || Kitt Peak || Spacewatch || PAD || align=right | 3.6 km || 
|-id=771 bgcolor=#E9E9E9
| 196771 ||  || — || September 23, 2003 || Haleakala || NEAT || AST || align=right | 2.8 km || 
|-id=772 bgcolor=#d6d6d6
| 196772 Fritzleiber ||  ||  || September 23, 2003 || Saint-Sulpice || B. Christophe || KOR || align=right | 2.0 km || 
|-id=773 bgcolor=#d6d6d6
| 196773 ||  || — || September 18, 2003 || Campo Imperatore || CINEOS || — || align=right | 4.0 km || 
|-id=774 bgcolor=#E9E9E9
| 196774 ||  || — || September 19, 2003 || Kitt Peak || Spacewatch || AGN || align=right | 2.1 km || 
|-id=775 bgcolor=#d6d6d6
| 196775 ||  || — || September 19, 2003 || Palomar || NEAT || — || align=right | 4.4 km || 
|-id=776 bgcolor=#d6d6d6
| 196776 ||  || — || September 20, 2003 || Kitt Peak || Spacewatch || KOR || align=right | 1.9 km || 
|-id=777 bgcolor=#E9E9E9
| 196777 ||  || — || September 20, 2003 || Socorro || LINEAR || — || align=right | 3.6 km || 
|-id=778 bgcolor=#d6d6d6
| 196778 ||  || — || September 20, 2003 || Kitt Peak || Spacewatch || KOR || align=right | 2.6 km || 
|-id=779 bgcolor=#d6d6d6
| 196779 ||  || — || September 20, 2003 || Socorro || LINEAR || — || align=right | 3.1 km || 
|-id=780 bgcolor=#E9E9E9
| 196780 ||  || — || September 20, 2003 || Socorro || LINEAR || DOR || align=right | 4.7 km || 
|-id=781 bgcolor=#d6d6d6
| 196781 ||  || — || September 21, 2003 || Kitt Peak || Spacewatch || — || align=right | 4.0 km || 
|-id=782 bgcolor=#d6d6d6
| 196782 ||  || — || September 21, 2003 || Kitt Peak || Spacewatch || KOR || align=right | 2.2 km || 
|-id=783 bgcolor=#d6d6d6
| 196783 ||  || — || September 21, 2003 || Kitt Peak || Spacewatch || CHA || align=right | 3.6 km || 
|-id=784 bgcolor=#E9E9E9
| 196784 ||  || — || September 22, 2003 || Anderson Mesa || LONEOS || — || align=right | 4.3 km || 
|-id=785 bgcolor=#E9E9E9
| 196785 ||  || — || September 22, 2003 || Anderson Mesa || LONEOS || GEF || align=right | 1.9 km || 
|-id=786 bgcolor=#d6d6d6
| 196786 ||  || — || September 21, 2003 || Haleakala || NEAT || — || align=right | 3.7 km || 
|-id=787 bgcolor=#E9E9E9
| 196787 ||  || — || September 22, 2003 || Anderson Mesa || LONEOS || — || align=right | 4.3 km || 
|-id=788 bgcolor=#E9E9E9
| 196788 ||  || — || September 22, 2003 || Palomar || NEAT || — || align=right | 4.3 km || 
|-id=789 bgcolor=#E9E9E9
| 196789 ||  || — || September 22, 2003 || Anderson Mesa || LONEOS || — || align=right | 3.3 km || 
|-id=790 bgcolor=#E9E9E9
| 196790 ||  || — || September 17, 2003 || Kitt Peak || Spacewatch || HOF || align=right | 3.6 km || 
|-id=791 bgcolor=#d6d6d6
| 196791 ||  || — || September 19, 2003 || Kitt Peak || Spacewatch || — || align=right | 4.9 km || 
|-id=792 bgcolor=#d6d6d6
| 196792 ||  || — || September 20, 2003 || Palomar || NEAT || ALA || align=right | 7.1 km || 
|-id=793 bgcolor=#d6d6d6
| 196793 ||  || — || September 20, 2003 || Palomar || NEAT || — || align=right | 3.6 km || 
|-id=794 bgcolor=#d6d6d6
| 196794 ||  || — || September 21, 2003 || Anderson Mesa || LONEOS || EOS || align=right | 2.7 km || 
|-id=795 bgcolor=#d6d6d6
| 196795 ||  || — || September 21, 2003 || Anderson Mesa || LONEOS || — || align=right | 6.6 km || 
|-id=796 bgcolor=#d6d6d6
| 196796 ||  || — || September 21, 2003 || Anderson Mesa || LONEOS || EOS || align=right | 3.4 km || 
|-id=797 bgcolor=#d6d6d6
| 196797 ||  || — || September 21, 2003 || Anderson Mesa || LONEOS || — || align=right | 4.7 km || 
|-id=798 bgcolor=#d6d6d6
| 196798 ||  || — || September 21, 2003 || Anderson Mesa || LONEOS || EOS || align=right | 3.8 km || 
|-id=799 bgcolor=#d6d6d6
| 196799 ||  || — || September 21, 2003 || Anderson Mesa || LONEOS || — || align=right | 4.6 km || 
|-id=800 bgcolor=#d6d6d6
| 196800 ||  || — || September 25, 2003 || Gnosca || S. Sposetti || — || align=right | 2.8 km || 
|}

196801–196900 

|-bgcolor=#E9E9E9
| 196801 ||  || — || September 22, 2003 || Anderson Mesa || LONEOS || — || align=right | 3.2 km || 
|-id=802 bgcolor=#d6d6d6
| 196802 ||  || — || September 22, 2003 || Socorro || LINEAR || — || align=right | 7.8 km || 
|-id=803 bgcolor=#d6d6d6
| 196803 ||  || — || September 23, 2003 || Palomar || NEAT || — || align=right | 5.0 km || 
|-id=804 bgcolor=#E9E9E9
| 196804 ||  || — || September 24, 2003 || Palomar || NEAT || DOR || align=right | 5.7 km || 
|-id=805 bgcolor=#d6d6d6
| 196805 ||  || — || September 25, 2003 || Haleakala || NEAT || HYG || align=right | 4.6 km || 
|-id=806 bgcolor=#d6d6d6
| 196806 ||  || — || September 28, 2003 || Desert Eagle || W. K. Y. Yeung || EOS || align=right | 3.3 km || 
|-id=807 bgcolor=#d6d6d6
| 196807 Beshore ||  ||  || September 26, 2003 || Junk Bond || D. Healy || — || align=right | 5.0 km || 
|-id=808 bgcolor=#d6d6d6
| 196808 ||  || — || September 29, 2003 || Desert Eagle || W. K. Y. Yeung || — || align=right | 3.6 km || 
|-id=809 bgcolor=#d6d6d6
| 196809 ||  || — || September 27, 2003 || Socorro || LINEAR || EUP || align=right | 8.2 km || 
|-id=810 bgcolor=#E9E9E9
| 196810 ||  || — || September 24, 2003 || Bergisch Gladbach || W. Bickel || — || align=right | 1.6 km || 
|-id=811 bgcolor=#d6d6d6
| 196811 ||  || — || September 26, 2003 || Desert Eagle || W. K. Y. Yeung || — || align=right | 3.8 km || 
|-id=812 bgcolor=#E9E9E9
| 196812 ||  || — || September 26, 2003 || Socorro || LINEAR || — || align=right | 3.8 km || 
|-id=813 bgcolor=#d6d6d6
| 196813 ||  || — || September 26, 2003 || Socorro || LINEAR || — || align=right | 3.1 km || 
|-id=814 bgcolor=#d6d6d6
| 196814 ||  || — || September 26, 2003 || Socorro || LINEAR || EOS || align=right | 4.0 km || 
|-id=815 bgcolor=#d6d6d6
| 196815 ||  || — || September 27, 2003 || Socorro || LINEAR || — || align=right | 5.3 km || 
|-id=816 bgcolor=#d6d6d6
| 196816 ||  || — || September 27, 2003 || Kitt Peak || Spacewatch || — || align=right | 3.5 km || 
|-id=817 bgcolor=#E9E9E9
| 196817 ||  || — || September 24, 2003 || Palomar || NEAT || — || align=right | 4.1 km || 
|-id=818 bgcolor=#d6d6d6
| 196818 ||  || — || September 24, 2003 || Palomar || NEAT || — || align=right | 6.4 km || 
|-id=819 bgcolor=#d6d6d6
| 196819 ||  || — || September 24, 2003 || Haleakala || NEAT || — || align=right | 3.2 km || 
|-id=820 bgcolor=#d6d6d6
| 196820 ||  || — || September 24, 2003 || Haleakala || NEAT || EOS || align=right | 3.4 km || 
|-id=821 bgcolor=#E9E9E9
| 196821 ||  || — || September 25, 2003 || Palomar || NEAT || — || align=right | 3.0 km || 
|-id=822 bgcolor=#d6d6d6
| 196822 ||  || — || September 25, 2003 || Haleakala || NEAT || — || align=right | 5.5 km || 
|-id=823 bgcolor=#E9E9E9
| 196823 ||  || — || September 25, 2003 || Haleakala || NEAT || AEO || align=right | 2.7 km || 
|-id=824 bgcolor=#E9E9E9
| 196824 ||  || — || September 27, 2003 || Socorro || LINEAR || — || align=right | 2.7 km || 
|-id=825 bgcolor=#d6d6d6
| 196825 ||  || — || September 27, 2003 || Socorro || LINEAR || — || align=right | 4.7 km || 
|-id=826 bgcolor=#E9E9E9
| 196826 ||  || — || September 26, 2003 || Socorro || LINEAR || WIT || align=right | 1.3 km || 
|-id=827 bgcolor=#d6d6d6
| 196827 ||  || — || September 26, 2003 || Socorro || LINEAR || — || align=right | 3.1 km || 
|-id=828 bgcolor=#d6d6d6
| 196828 ||  || — || September 26, 2003 || Socorro || LINEAR || — || align=right | 3.6 km || 
|-id=829 bgcolor=#E9E9E9
| 196829 ||  || — || September 27, 2003 || Socorro || LINEAR || — || align=right | 3.6 km || 
|-id=830 bgcolor=#E9E9E9
| 196830 ||  || — || September 27, 2003 || Kitt Peak || Spacewatch || AGN || align=right | 1.3 km || 
|-id=831 bgcolor=#d6d6d6
| 196831 ||  || — || September 28, 2003 || Socorro || LINEAR || KOR || align=right | 1.9 km || 
|-id=832 bgcolor=#E9E9E9
| 196832 ||  || — || September 26, 2003 || Socorro || LINEAR || AST || align=right | 4.2 km || 
|-id=833 bgcolor=#d6d6d6
| 196833 ||  || — || September 26, 2003 || Socorro || LINEAR || — || align=right | 5.6 km || 
|-id=834 bgcolor=#d6d6d6
| 196834 ||  || — || September 26, 2003 || Socorro || LINEAR || KOR || align=right | 2.4 km || 
|-id=835 bgcolor=#d6d6d6
| 196835 ||  || — || September 26, 2003 || Socorro || LINEAR || KOR || align=right | 2.5 km || 
|-id=836 bgcolor=#E9E9E9
| 196836 ||  || — || September 26, 2003 || Socorro || LINEAR || AGN || align=right | 2.1 km || 
|-id=837 bgcolor=#d6d6d6
| 196837 ||  || — || September 26, 2003 || Socorro || LINEAR || EMA || align=right | 6.3 km || 
|-id=838 bgcolor=#d6d6d6
| 196838 ||  || — || September 26, 2003 || Socorro || LINEAR || — || align=right | 5.4 km || 
|-id=839 bgcolor=#d6d6d6
| 196839 ||  || — || September 26, 2003 || Socorro || LINEAR || — || align=right | 5.5 km || 
|-id=840 bgcolor=#E9E9E9
| 196840 ||  || — || September 27, 2003 || Kitt Peak || Spacewatch || NEM || align=right | 3.4 km || 
|-id=841 bgcolor=#E9E9E9
| 196841 ||  || — || September 27, 2003 || Socorro || LINEAR || — || align=right | 5.3 km || 
|-id=842 bgcolor=#E9E9E9
| 196842 ||  || — || September 27, 2003 || Kitt Peak || Spacewatch || — || align=right | 1.6 km || 
|-id=843 bgcolor=#d6d6d6
| 196843 ||  || — || September 27, 2003 || Kitt Peak || Spacewatch || — || align=right | 4.4 km || 
|-id=844 bgcolor=#d6d6d6
| 196844 ||  || — || September 27, 2003 || Kitt Peak || Spacewatch || — || align=right | 4.2 km || 
|-id=845 bgcolor=#d6d6d6
| 196845 ||  || — || September 28, 2003 || Kitt Peak || Spacewatch || — || align=right | 3.3 km || 
|-id=846 bgcolor=#d6d6d6
| 196846 ||  || — || September 28, 2003 || Socorro || LINEAR || — || align=right | 3.2 km || 
|-id=847 bgcolor=#E9E9E9
| 196847 ||  || — || September 28, 2003 || Kitt Peak || Spacewatch || — || align=right | 3.6 km || 
|-id=848 bgcolor=#d6d6d6
| 196848 ||  || — || September 28, 2003 || Kitt Peak || Spacewatch || — || align=right | 3.8 km || 
|-id=849 bgcolor=#d6d6d6
| 196849 ||  || — || September 28, 2003 || Kitt Peak || Spacewatch || — || align=right | 5.1 km || 
|-id=850 bgcolor=#d6d6d6
| 196850 ||  || — || September 29, 2003 || Socorro || LINEAR || EUP || align=right | 7.5 km || 
|-id=851 bgcolor=#E9E9E9
| 196851 ||  || — || September 27, 2003 || Socorro || LINEAR || — || align=right | 3.4 km || 
|-id=852 bgcolor=#d6d6d6
| 196852 ||  || — || September 28, 2003 || Socorro || LINEAR || KOR || align=right | 2.2 km || 
|-id=853 bgcolor=#d6d6d6
| 196853 ||  || — || September 28, 2003 || Socorro || LINEAR || — || align=right | 3.8 km || 
|-id=854 bgcolor=#d6d6d6
| 196854 ||  || — || September 29, 2003 || Socorro || LINEAR || — || align=right | 3.6 km || 
|-id=855 bgcolor=#d6d6d6
| 196855 ||  || — || September 29, 2003 || Socorro || LINEAR || — || align=right | 4.4 km || 
|-id=856 bgcolor=#E9E9E9
| 196856 ||  || — || September 29, 2003 || Kitt Peak || Spacewatch || AGN || align=right | 2.1 km || 
|-id=857 bgcolor=#E9E9E9
| 196857 ||  || — || September 29, 2003 || Kitt Peak || Spacewatch || — || align=right | 2.7 km || 
|-id=858 bgcolor=#E9E9E9
| 196858 ||  || — || September 25, 2003 || Uccle || T. Pauwels || — || align=right | 3.6 km || 
|-id=859 bgcolor=#d6d6d6
| 196859 ||  || — || September 25, 2003 || Haleakala || NEAT || EOS || align=right | 3.4 km || 
|-id=860 bgcolor=#E9E9E9
| 196860 ||  || — || September 27, 2003 || Socorro || LINEAR || — || align=right | 2.9 km || 
|-id=861 bgcolor=#d6d6d6
| 196861 ||  || — || September 27, 2003 || Socorro || LINEAR || — || align=right | 4.8 km || 
|-id=862 bgcolor=#d6d6d6
| 196862 ||  || — || September 27, 2003 || Socorro || LINEAR || — || align=right | 5.5 km || 
|-id=863 bgcolor=#d6d6d6
| 196863 ||  || — || September 30, 2003 || Socorro || LINEAR || EOS || align=right | 2.3 km || 
|-id=864 bgcolor=#d6d6d6
| 196864 ||  || — || September 30, 2003 || Socorro || LINEAR || — || align=right | 4.7 km || 
|-id=865 bgcolor=#d6d6d6
| 196865 ||  || — || September 30, 2003 || Socorro || LINEAR || — || align=right | 6.8 km || 
|-id=866 bgcolor=#E9E9E9
| 196866 ||  || — || September 18, 2003 || Kitt Peak || Spacewatch || AGN || align=right | 1.8 km || 
|-id=867 bgcolor=#d6d6d6
| 196867 ||  || — || September 19, 2003 || Anderson Mesa || LONEOS || — || align=right | 2.9 km || 
|-id=868 bgcolor=#E9E9E9
| 196868 ||  || — || September 19, 2003 || Anderson Mesa || LONEOS || — || align=right | 4.0 km || 
|-id=869 bgcolor=#d6d6d6
| 196869 ||  || — || September 20, 2003 || Socorro || LINEAR || EOS || align=right | 2.6 km || 
|-id=870 bgcolor=#d6d6d6
| 196870 ||  || — || September 28, 2003 || Socorro || LINEAR || — || align=right | 4.1 km || 
|-id=871 bgcolor=#E9E9E9
| 196871 ||  || — || September 28, 2003 || Anderson Mesa || LONEOS || — || align=right | 3.6 km || 
|-id=872 bgcolor=#d6d6d6
| 196872 ||  || — || September 25, 2003 || Haleakala || NEAT || — || align=right | 4.0 km || 
|-id=873 bgcolor=#d6d6d6
| 196873 ||  || — || September 27, 2003 || Socorro || LINEAR || — || align=right | 5.1 km || 
|-id=874 bgcolor=#fefefe
| 196874 ||  || — || September 28, 2003 || Socorro || LINEAR || H || align=right data-sort-value="0.99" | 990 m || 
|-id=875 bgcolor=#d6d6d6
| 196875 ||  || — || September 18, 2003 || Haleakala || NEAT || — || align=right | 6.6 km || 
|-id=876 bgcolor=#d6d6d6
| 196876 ||  || — || September 16, 2003 || Kitt Peak || Spacewatch || — || align=right | 4.2 km || 
|-id=877 bgcolor=#E9E9E9
| 196877 ||  || — || September 17, 2003 || Palomar || NEAT || GEF || align=right | 2.9 km || 
|-id=878 bgcolor=#d6d6d6
| 196878 ||  || — || September 17, 2003 || Palomar || NEAT || — || align=right | 4.2 km || 
|-id=879 bgcolor=#d6d6d6
| 196879 ||  || — || September 30, 2003 || Socorro || LINEAR || — || align=right | 4.4 km || 
|-id=880 bgcolor=#d6d6d6
| 196880 ||  || — || September 27, 2003 || Socorro || LINEAR || — || align=right | 5.6 km || 
|-id=881 bgcolor=#d6d6d6
| 196881 ||  || — || September 29, 2003 || Anderson Mesa || LONEOS || URS || align=right | 5.8 km || 
|-id=882 bgcolor=#E9E9E9
| 196882 ||  || — || September 28, 2003 || Socorro || LINEAR || — || align=right | 3.9 km || 
|-id=883 bgcolor=#d6d6d6
| 196883 ||  || — || September 29, 2003 || Socorro || LINEAR || — || align=right | 3.7 km || 
|-id=884 bgcolor=#d6d6d6
| 196884 ||  || — || September 30, 2003 || Kitt Peak || Spacewatch || KOR || align=right | 2.9 km || 
|-id=885 bgcolor=#d6d6d6
| 196885 ||  || — || September 28, 2003 || Socorro || LINEAR || — || align=right | 3.1 km || 
|-id=886 bgcolor=#d6d6d6
| 196886 ||  || — || September 21, 2003 || Kitt Peak || Spacewatch || KAR || align=right | 1.9 km || 
|-id=887 bgcolor=#d6d6d6
| 196887 ||  || — || September 17, 2003 || Kitt Peak || Spacewatch || — || align=right | 2.9 km || 
|-id=888 bgcolor=#d6d6d6
| 196888 ||  || — || September 17, 2003 || Kitt Peak || Spacewatch || — || align=right | 5.9 km || 
|-id=889 bgcolor=#d6d6d6
| 196889 ||  || — || September 21, 2003 || Kitt Peak || Spacewatch || — || align=right | 4.2 km || 
|-id=890 bgcolor=#d6d6d6
| 196890 ||  || — || September 28, 2003 || Kitt Peak || Spacewatch || KOR || align=right | 2.0 km || 
|-id=891 bgcolor=#E9E9E9
| 196891 ||  || — || September 22, 2003 || Anderson Mesa || LONEOS || — || align=right | 1.8 km || 
|-id=892 bgcolor=#E9E9E9
| 196892 ||  || — || September 18, 2003 || Kitt Peak || Spacewatch || — || align=right | 1.9 km || 
|-id=893 bgcolor=#d6d6d6
| 196893 || 2003 TS || — || October 2, 2003 || Essen || Walter Hohmann Obs. || EOS || align=right | 2.6 km || 
|-id=894 bgcolor=#d6d6d6
| 196894 ||  || — || October 3, 2003 || Haleakala || NEAT || KOR || align=right | 1.9 km || 
|-id=895 bgcolor=#d6d6d6
| 196895 ||  || — || October 4, 2003 || Goodricke-Pigott || V. Reddy || — || align=right | 4.5 km || 
|-id=896 bgcolor=#d6d6d6
| 196896 ||  || — || October 1, 2003 || Kitt Peak || Spacewatch || EOS || align=right | 5.1 km || 
|-id=897 bgcolor=#d6d6d6
| 196897 ||  || — || October 1, 2003 || Anderson Mesa || LONEOS || SAN || align=right | 3.1 km || 
|-id=898 bgcolor=#d6d6d6
| 196898 ||  || — || October 15, 2003 || Socorro || LINEAR || — || align=right | 5.6 km || 
|-id=899 bgcolor=#d6d6d6
| 196899 ||  || — || October 15, 2003 || Palomar || NEAT || KOR || align=right | 2.4 km || 
|-id=900 bgcolor=#d6d6d6
| 196900 ||  || — || October 14, 2003 || Anderson Mesa || LONEOS || — || align=right | 5.2 km || 
|}

196901–197000 

|-bgcolor=#fefefe
| 196901 ||  || — || October 14, 2003 || Anderson Mesa || LONEOS || H || align=right | 1.1 km || 
|-id=902 bgcolor=#d6d6d6
| 196902 ||  || — || October 4, 2003 || Kitt Peak || Spacewatch || — || align=right | 6.4 km || 
|-id=903 bgcolor=#d6d6d6
| 196903 ||  || — || October 15, 2003 || Anderson Mesa || LONEOS || — || align=right | 3.5 km || 
|-id=904 bgcolor=#E9E9E9
| 196904 ||  || — || October 15, 2003 || Anderson Mesa || LONEOS || HOF || align=right | 5.9 km || 
|-id=905 bgcolor=#d6d6d6
| 196905 ||  || — || October 15, 2003 || Anderson Mesa || LONEOS || KOR || align=right | 2.3 km || 
|-id=906 bgcolor=#E9E9E9
| 196906 ||  || — || October 14, 2003 || Palomar || NEAT || — || align=right | 1.7 km || 
|-id=907 bgcolor=#E9E9E9
| 196907 ||  || — || October 15, 2003 || Anderson Mesa || LONEOS || — || align=right | 3.4 km || 
|-id=908 bgcolor=#d6d6d6
| 196908 ||  || — || October 1, 2003 || Anderson Mesa || LONEOS || KOR || align=right | 2.5 km || 
|-id=909 bgcolor=#d6d6d6
| 196909 ||  || — || October 1, 2003 || Kitt Peak || Spacewatch || — || align=right | 4.1 km || 
|-id=910 bgcolor=#d6d6d6
| 196910 ||  || — || October 1, 2003 || Kitt Peak || Spacewatch || — || align=right | 4.3 km || 
|-id=911 bgcolor=#d6d6d6
| 196911 ||  || — || October 1, 2003 || Kitt Peak || Spacewatch || — || align=right | 2.9 km || 
|-id=912 bgcolor=#d6d6d6
| 196912 ||  || — || October 1, 2003 || Kitt Peak || Spacewatch || — || align=right | 3.9 km || 
|-id=913 bgcolor=#d6d6d6
| 196913 ||  || — || October 1, 2003 || Kitt Peak || Spacewatch || KOR || align=right | 1.7 km || 
|-id=914 bgcolor=#E9E9E9
| 196914 ||  || — || October 2, 2003 || Kitt Peak || Spacewatch || — || align=right | 4.0 km || 
|-id=915 bgcolor=#d6d6d6
| 196915 ||  || — || October 3, 2003 || Kitt Peak || Spacewatch || — || align=right | 3.6 km || 
|-id=916 bgcolor=#d6d6d6
| 196916 ||  || — || October 3, 2003 || Kitt Peak || Spacewatch || — || align=right | 4.0 km || 
|-id=917 bgcolor=#E9E9E9
| 196917 ||  || — || October 3, 2003 || Kitt Peak || Spacewatch || — || align=right | 3.4 km || 
|-id=918 bgcolor=#E9E9E9
| 196918 ||  || — || October 5, 2003 || Kitt Peak || Spacewatch || HOF || align=right | 3.6 km || 
|-id=919 bgcolor=#E9E9E9
| 196919 ||  || — || October 5, 2003 || Kitt Peak || Spacewatch || WIT || align=right | 1.5 km || 
|-id=920 bgcolor=#d6d6d6
| 196920 ||  || — || October 5, 2003 || Kitt Peak || Spacewatch || — || align=right | 2.5 km || 
|-id=921 bgcolor=#d6d6d6
| 196921 ||  || — || October 5, 2003 || Socorro || LINEAR || — || align=right | 4.2 km || 
|-id=922 bgcolor=#E9E9E9
| 196922 ||  || — || October 16, 2003 || Kitt Peak || Spacewatch || AGN || align=right | 1.8 km || 
|-id=923 bgcolor=#d6d6d6
| 196923 ||  || — || October 16, 2003 || Kitt Peak || Spacewatch || EOS || align=right | 2.3 km || 
|-id=924 bgcolor=#E9E9E9
| 196924 ||  || — || October 16, 2003 || Kitt Peak || Spacewatch || — || align=right | 4.1 km || 
|-id=925 bgcolor=#d6d6d6
| 196925 ||  || — || October 16, 2003 || Palomar || NEAT || ALA || align=right | 7.2 km || 
|-id=926 bgcolor=#d6d6d6
| 196926 ||  || — || October 18, 2003 || Wrightwood || J. W. Young || — || align=right | 4.3 km || 
|-id=927 bgcolor=#d6d6d6
| 196927 ||  || — || October 18, 2003 || Palomar || NEAT || EUP || align=right | 6.1 km || 
|-id=928 bgcolor=#d6d6d6
| 196928 ||  || — || October 16, 2003 || Socorro || LINEAR || EUP || align=right | 6.6 km || 
|-id=929 bgcolor=#d6d6d6
| 196929 ||  || — || October 17, 2003 || Anderson Mesa || LONEOS || — || align=right | 6.9 km || 
|-id=930 bgcolor=#d6d6d6
| 196930 ||  || — || October 19, 2003 || Kitt Peak || Spacewatch || — || align=right | 3.7 km || 
|-id=931 bgcolor=#d6d6d6
| 196931 ||  || — || October 20, 2003 || Kitt Peak || Spacewatch || — || align=right | 2.6 km || 
|-id=932 bgcolor=#d6d6d6
| 196932 ||  || — || October 16, 2003 || Kitt Peak || Spacewatch || — || align=right | 4.9 km || 
|-id=933 bgcolor=#d6d6d6
| 196933 ||  || — || October 16, 2003 || Kitt Peak || Spacewatch || — || align=right | 3.3 km || 
|-id=934 bgcolor=#d6d6d6
| 196934 ||  || — || October 16, 2003 || Kitt Peak || Spacewatch || — || align=right | 3.8 km || 
|-id=935 bgcolor=#d6d6d6
| 196935 ||  || — || October 16, 2003 || Anderson Mesa || LONEOS || ALA || align=right | 6.1 km || 
|-id=936 bgcolor=#d6d6d6
| 196936 ||  || — || October 16, 2003 || Anderson Mesa || LONEOS || THM || align=right | 5.3 km || 
|-id=937 bgcolor=#d6d6d6
| 196937 ||  || — || October 16, 2003 || Palomar || NEAT || — || align=right | 5.6 km || 
|-id=938 bgcolor=#d6d6d6
| 196938 Delgordon ||  ||  || October 22, 2003 || Junk Bond || D. Healy || — || align=right | 3.8 km || 
|-id=939 bgcolor=#d6d6d6
| 196939 ||  || — || October 20, 2003 || Palomar || NEAT || — || align=right | 4.8 km || 
|-id=940 bgcolor=#d6d6d6
| 196940 ||  || — || October 22, 2003 || Kitt Peak || Spacewatch || THM || align=right | 4.6 km || 
|-id=941 bgcolor=#d6d6d6
| 196941 ||  || — || October 23, 2003 || Needville || Needville Obs. || EOS || align=right | 2.6 km || 
|-id=942 bgcolor=#fefefe
| 196942 ||  || — || October 23, 2003 || Socorro || LINEAR || H || align=right | 1.0 km || 
|-id=943 bgcolor=#d6d6d6
| 196943 ||  || — || October 23, 2003 || Anderson Mesa || LONEOS || — || align=right | 6.1 km || 
|-id=944 bgcolor=#d6d6d6
| 196944 ||  || — || October 19, 2003 || Kitt Peak || Spacewatch || — || align=right | 4.7 km || 
|-id=945 bgcolor=#d6d6d6
| 196945 Guerin ||  ||  || October 26, 2003 || Ottmarsheim || C. Rinner || — || align=right | 3.0 km || 
|-id=946 bgcolor=#E9E9E9
| 196946 ||  || — || October 16, 2003 || Kitt Peak || Spacewatch || — || align=right | 2.9 km || 
|-id=947 bgcolor=#d6d6d6
| 196947 ||  || — || October 16, 2003 || Palomar || NEAT || — || align=right | 5.7 km || 
|-id=948 bgcolor=#d6d6d6
| 196948 ||  || — || October 26, 2003 || Kleť || Kleť Obs. || — || align=right | 4.2 km || 
|-id=949 bgcolor=#d6d6d6
| 196949 ||  || — || October 16, 2003 || Anderson Mesa || LONEOS || ALA || align=right | 6.2 km || 
|-id=950 bgcolor=#d6d6d6
| 196950 ||  || — || October 17, 2003 || Kitt Peak || Spacewatch || — || align=right | 2.9 km || 
|-id=951 bgcolor=#d6d6d6
| 196951 ||  || — || October 18, 2003 || Kitt Peak || Spacewatch || KOR || align=right | 1.9 km || 
|-id=952 bgcolor=#d6d6d6
| 196952 ||  || — || October 16, 2003 || Anderson Mesa || LONEOS || — || align=right | 3.8 km || 
|-id=953 bgcolor=#d6d6d6
| 196953 ||  || — || October 17, 2003 || Kitt Peak || Spacewatch || — || align=right | 5.4 km || 
|-id=954 bgcolor=#d6d6d6
| 196954 ||  || — || October 18, 2003 || Palomar || NEAT || — || align=right | 3.4 km || 
|-id=955 bgcolor=#d6d6d6
| 196955 ||  || — || October 18, 2003 || Palomar || NEAT || — || align=right | 5.0 km || 
|-id=956 bgcolor=#d6d6d6
| 196956 ||  || — || October 18, 2003 || Palomar || NEAT || — || align=right | 4.1 km || 
|-id=957 bgcolor=#d6d6d6
| 196957 ||  || — || October 18, 2003 || Palomar || NEAT || — || align=right | 4.7 km || 
|-id=958 bgcolor=#d6d6d6
| 196958 ||  || — || October 18, 2003 || Palomar || NEAT || — || align=right | 4.1 km || 
|-id=959 bgcolor=#d6d6d6
| 196959 ||  || — || October 18, 2003 || Palomar || NEAT || — || align=right | 3.2 km || 
|-id=960 bgcolor=#d6d6d6
| 196960 ||  || — || October 18, 2003 || Palomar || NEAT || TIR || align=right | 2.7 km || 
|-id=961 bgcolor=#d6d6d6
| 196961 ||  || — || October 18, 2003 || Palomar || NEAT || — || align=right | 5.1 km || 
|-id=962 bgcolor=#fefefe
| 196962 ||  || — || October 18, 2003 || Palomar || NEAT || H || align=right | 1.6 km || 
|-id=963 bgcolor=#d6d6d6
| 196963 ||  || — || October 19, 2003 || Goodricke-Pigott || R. A. Tucker || — || align=right | 5.0 km || 
|-id=964 bgcolor=#d6d6d6
| 196964 ||  || — || October 23, 2003 || Anderson Mesa || LONEOS || — || align=right | 3.4 km || 
|-id=965 bgcolor=#d6d6d6
| 196965 ||  || — || October 23, 2003 || Kitt Peak || Spacewatch || — || align=right | 3.0 km || 
|-id=966 bgcolor=#E9E9E9
| 196966 ||  || — || October 24, 2003 || Socorro || LINEAR || MRX || align=right | 1.9 km || 
|-id=967 bgcolor=#d6d6d6
| 196967 ||  || — || October 27, 2003 || Kvistaberg || UDAS || HYG || align=right | 6.6 km || 
|-id=968 bgcolor=#d6d6d6
| 196968 ||  || — || October 16, 2003 || Palomar || NEAT || — || align=right | 6.3 km || 
|-id=969 bgcolor=#d6d6d6
| 196969 ||  || — || October 16, 2003 || Kitt Peak || Spacewatch || — || align=right | 7.2 km || 
|-id=970 bgcolor=#d6d6d6
| 196970 ||  || — || October 17, 2003 || Anderson Mesa || LONEOS || — || align=right | 5.8 km || 
|-id=971 bgcolor=#E9E9E9
| 196971 ||  || — || October 16, 2003 || Palomar || NEAT || — || align=right | 2.4 km || 
|-id=972 bgcolor=#d6d6d6
| 196972 ||  || — || October 16, 2003 || Anderson Mesa || LONEOS || — || align=right | 4.9 km || 
|-id=973 bgcolor=#E9E9E9
| 196973 ||  || — || October 16, 2003 || Anderson Mesa || LONEOS || — || align=right | 3.7 km || 
|-id=974 bgcolor=#d6d6d6
| 196974 ||  || — || October 16, 2003 || Anderson Mesa || LONEOS || SAN || align=right | 3.0 km || 
|-id=975 bgcolor=#d6d6d6
| 196975 ||  || — || October 16, 2003 || Anderson Mesa || LONEOS || — || align=right | 5.6 km || 
|-id=976 bgcolor=#d6d6d6
| 196976 ||  || — || October 16, 2003 || Anderson Mesa || LONEOS || EOS || align=right | 3.6 km || 
|-id=977 bgcolor=#d6d6d6
| 196977 ||  || — || October 16, 2003 || Palomar || NEAT || — || align=right | 5.2 km || 
|-id=978 bgcolor=#E9E9E9
| 196978 ||  || — || October 18, 2003 || Kitt Peak || Spacewatch || — || align=right | 3.1 km || 
|-id=979 bgcolor=#d6d6d6
| 196979 ||  || — || October 18, 2003 || Kitt Peak || Spacewatch || — || align=right | 3.6 km || 
|-id=980 bgcolor=#d6d6d6
| 196980 ||  || — || October 17, 2003 || Anderson Mesa || LONEOS || NAE || align=right | 5.7 km || 
|-id=981 bgcolor=#d6d6d6
| 196981 ||  || — || October 17, 2003 || Anderson Mesa || LONEOS || EOS || align=right | 2.8 km || 
|-id=982 bgcolor=#d6d6d6
| 196982 ||  || — || October 18, 2003 || Haleakala || NEAT || — || align=right | 6.1 km || 
|-id=983 bgcolor=#E9E9E9
| 196983 ||  || — || October 19, 2003 || Socorro || LINEAR || — || align=right | 4.5 km || 
|-id=984 bgcolor=#d6d6d6
| 196984 ||  || — || October 19, 2003 || Kitt Peak || Spacewatch || CHA || align=right | 3.9 km || 
|-id=985 bgcolor=#d6d6d6
| 196985 ||  || — || October 18, 2003 || Goodricke-Pigott || R. A. Tucker || — || align=right | 6.1 km || 
|-id=986 bgcolor=#d6d6d6
| 196986 ||  || — || October 17, 2003 || Goodricke-Pigott || R. A. Tucker || EUP || align=right | 8.2 km || 
|-id=987 bgcolor=#d6d6d6
| 196987 ||  || — || October 16, 2003 || Haleakala || NEAT || — || align=right | 5.1 km || 
|-id=988 bgcolor=#E9E9E9
| 196988 ||  || — || October 18, 2003 || Haleakala || NEAT || — || align=right | 4.7 km || 
|-id=989 bgcolor=#d6d6d6
| 196989 ||  || — || October 16, 2003 || Haleakala || NEAT || — || align=right | 3.4 km || 
|-id=990 bgcolor=#d6d6d6
| 196990 ||  || — || October 17, 2003 || Anderson Mesa || LONEOS || — || align=right | 5.1 km || 
|-id=991 bgcolor=#d6d6d6
| 196991 ||  || — || October 18, 2003 || Kitt Peak || Spacewatch || EOS || align=right | 2.2 km || 
|-id=992 bgcolor=#d6d6d6
| 196992 ||  || — || October 18, 2003 || Kitt Peak || Spacewatch || — || align=right | 3.3 km || 
|-id=993 bgcolor=#d6d6d6
| 196993 ||  || — || October 18, 2003 || Kitt Peak || Spacewatch || — || align=right | 3.2 km || 
|-id=994 bgcolor=#d6d6d6
| 196994 ||  || — || October 18, 2003 || Palomar || NEAT || URS || align=right | 7.6 km || 
|-id=995 bgcolor=#d6d6d6
| 196995 ||  || — || October 19, 2003 || Anderson Mesa || LONEOS || — || align=right | 6.1 km || 
|-id=996 bgcolor=#E9E9E9
| 196996 ||  || — || October 19, 2003 || Anderson Mesa || LONEOS || MAR || align=right | 1.9 km || 
|-id=997 bgcolor=#d6d6d6
| 196997 ||  || — || October 20, 2003 || Kitt Peak || Spacewatch || — || align=right | 4.0 km || 
|-id=998 bgcolor=#d6d6d6
| 196998 ||  || — || October 18, 2003 || Kitt Peak || Spacewatch || — || align=right | 3.5 km || 
|-id=999 bgcolor=#d6d6d6
| 196999 ||  || — || October 18, 2003 || Kitt Peak || Spacewatch || — || align=right | 3.1 km || 
|-id=000 bgcolor=#E9E9E9
| 197000 ||  || — || October 18, 2003 || Kitt Peak || Spacewatch || HOF || align=right | 4.1 km || 
|}

References

External links 
 Discovery Circumstances: Numbered Minor Planets (195001)–(200000) (IAU Minor Planet Center)

0196